= Avenue of the Saints =

Highway between Minnesota and Missouri, US

Avenue of the Saints
- High Priority Corridor 2
- Avenue of the Saints highlighted in red

Route information
- Length: 563 mi (906 km)
- Existed: 1991–present
- Component highways: US 61 from Frontenac to Wayland, MO; Route 27 from Wayland, MO to the Iowa state line; Iowa 27 in Iowa; I-35 from Clear Lake and Mason City, IA to Burnsville, MN; I-35E from Burnsville to St. Paul, MN

Major junctions
- South end: I-64 / US 40 / US 61 / US 67 in Frontenac, MO
- I-64 / I-70 / US 40 at Wentzville, MO; I-72 / US 36 / Route 110 (CKC) at Hannibal, MO; US 34 / Iowa 163 at Mount Pleasant, IA; I-80 / I-380 at Coralville, IA; US 20 at Waterloo, IA; I-90 at Albert Lea, MN; I-494 at Mendota Heights, MN
- North end: I-94 at St. Paul, MN

Location
- Country: United States
- States: Missouri, Iowa, Minnesota

Highway system
- High-Priority Corridors
- Missouri State Highway System; Interstate; US; State; Supplemental
- Iowa Primary Highway System; Interstate; US; State; Secondary; Scenic
- Minnesota Trunk Highway System; Interstate; US; State; Legislative; Scenic
← Iowa 26	Iowa 27	→ Iowa 28
← Route 25	Route 27 (MO)	→ Route 28

The Avenue of the Saints is a 563-mile-long (906 km) high-priority highway corridor in the Midwestern United States that connects Frontenac (St. Louis), Missouri, and St. Paul, Minnesota. It follows parts of U.S. Route 61 (US 61), Route 27 in Missouri, Iowa Highway 27 (Iowa 27), and Interstate 35 (I-35). The route was proposed in the late 1980s, chosen in 1990, funded in 1991 and completed in 2008.

== Route description ==
=== Missouri ===
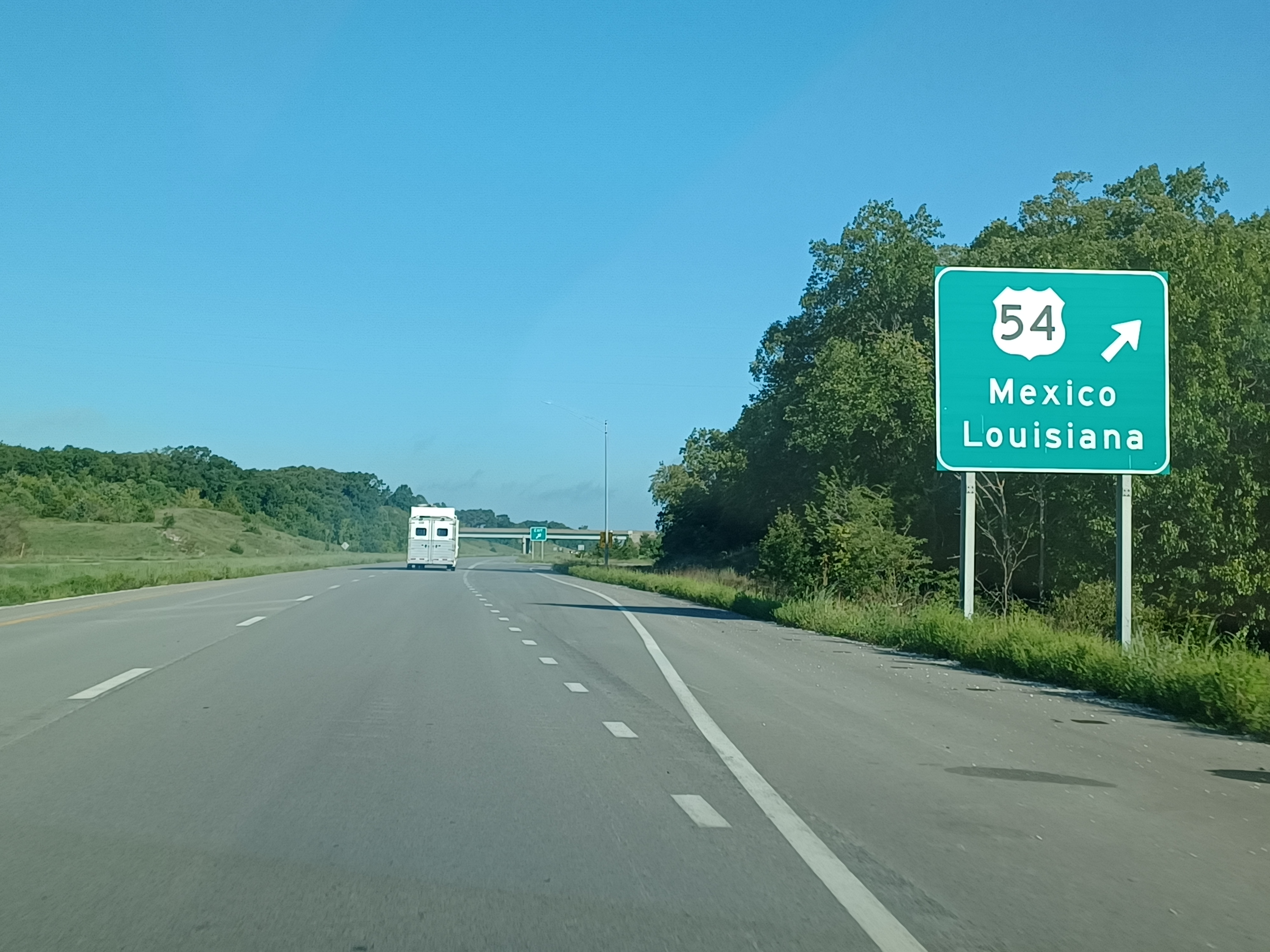
At U.S. Route 54 near Bowling Green, Missouri

The southern end of the Avenue of the Saints is at exit 28A on Interstate 64/U.S. Route 40 (I-64/US 40), which is also the southern end of its concurrency with US 61. The Avenue of the Saints heads west, to Chesterfield, crossing I-270. Here, the Avenue of the Saints turns northwest, crosses the Missouri River via the Daniel Boone Bridge. In Wentzville, the route intersects I-70. The western end of I‑64 and the northern end of the concurrency with US 40 is here. The Avenue of the Saints continues north as just US 61, intersects with the western end of I-72 in Hannibal, reaches the northern terminus of its concurrency with US 61, then crosses the Des Moines River into Iowa.

The Avenue of the Saints is co-signed with Missouri Route 27 to the Iowa state line. Prior to its designation as Route 27, the section between US 61 and US 136 was designated Spur US 136. The section north of US 136 was Missouri Supplemental Route B.

=== Iowa ===
In Iowa, the Avenue of the Saints is a 282-mile-long (454 km) highway, which begins in Lee County where Missouri Route 27 crosses the Des Moines River, and ends at the Iowa state line in Worth County, concurrent with Interstate 35. Construction of the Avenue of the Saints corridor in Iowa was completed on May 23, 2006.

The route runs north from the Missouri state line as just Iowa Highway 27 for about ten miles (16 km), then is co-signed with US 218 until just south of Cedar Rapids, crossing I-80 in Iowa City. This is also the location of the southern end of its concurrency with I‑380, and this concurrency terminates in Waterloo. Near Floyd, US 218 splits off, just after the route starts a concurrency with US 18, running west to its intersection with I-35, where the route turns north again and runs into Minnesota.

In 2001, the Iowa Department of Transportation designated the Avenue of the Saints as Iowa 27. Prior to its creation, motorists wanting to travel the Avenue through Iowa had to follow a lengthy list of directions: (heading north from Missouri) Iowa 394, US 218, I‑380, US 20, Iowa 58, US 218 (again), US 18 and I‑35.

As with many rural expressways in Iowa, the Avenue of the Saints has exit numbers in that state. The exit numbers correspond to the underlying U.S. Highway or Interstate Highway – US 218, I-380, US 20, US 18 and I‑35. The section along Iowa 58 in Cedar Falls has no exit numbers, and the separate section south of Donnellson has one numbered exit—the northbound one to US 218 south—based on Iowa 27's mileage.

=== Minnesota ===
In Minnesota, the Avenue of the Saints is officially routed along I-35 and I-35E for the entirety of its length in that state, but is not marked anywhere within the state. The route runs straight north, crosses I-90 in Albert Lea, and runs to its northern end in St. Paul, shortly after crossing the Mississippi River via the Lexington Bridge.

== History ==
The Avenue of the Saints was the concept of businessman Ernest Hayes of Mount Pleasant, Iowa who in the 1980s envisioned a four-lane highway between St. Paul and St. Louis. It was named by Gary Smith, who at the time was Executive Director of the Southeast Iowa Regional Planning Commission. Smith and Hayes convened a group of area business and political leaders, who organized an effort to convince the Iowa Department of Transportation to study the idea, which they did in 1988. Several politicians endorsed the idea, including then-mayor Tom Vilsack of Mount Pleasant, Senator Chuck Grassley of Iowa, and Congressmen David Nagle and Fred Grandy of Iowa and Dick Gephardt of Missouri.

By the end of 1989, four possible routes for the Avenue of the Saints were under consideration by the Federal Highway Administration. Two of the rejected routes would have followed US 52 and US 63 from St. Paul through Rochester, Minnesota, to Waterloo, Iowa. The third rejected route would have followed US 61 from St. Paul through La Crosse, Wisconsin, and Dubuque, Iowa to Davenport, Iowa and US 67 from Davenport, crossing the Mississippi River through western Illinois to Alton, Illinois and crossing the Mississippi and Missouri rivers to St. Louis.

In 1990 the FHWA chose its route for the Avenue of the Saints: the signed highway would follow the existing Interstate 35 from St. Paul to a point south of Clear Lake, Iowa; U.S. Route 18 to Charles City, Iowa; U.S. Route 218 to Cedar Falls, Iowa; U.S. Route 20 and Iowa Highway 58 around Cedar Falls and Waterloo, Iowa; Interstate 380 from Waterloo through Cedar Rapids to Interstate 80 near Coralville, Iowa and Iowa City, Iowa; U.S. Route 218 to Donnellson, Iowa; Iowa Highway 394 and Route B to Wayland, Missouri; and Interstate 64 and U.S. Route 61 from Wayland to St. Louis.

The Intermodal Surface Transportation Efficiency Act of 1991 made the Avenue of the Saints an official "high-priority corridor," and signs were put along the route by the end of the year. At that time the only four-lane segments were I‑35, I‑380, and I‑64; US 20 around Waterloo; US 218 from I‑80 to Iowa 22 near Riverside, Iowa; and two segments of US 61 in Missouri (from La Grange to New London and from Bowling Green to St. Louis). As a cost-saving measure, the government decided to build the Avenue of the Saints to expressway standards—with intersections at rural roads—rather than to full freeway standards. Freeway segments would be built around cities that needed to be bypassed.

After the routing was approved, both Iowa and Missouri began constructing new four-lane segments. Iowa opened bypasses around Waverly (1998), Mason City (1999), Charles City (2000), Mount Pleasant (2001), and Donnellson (2004). A four-lane link between I‑35 and I‑380 was completed with the opening of a segment near Nashua in November 2003. Missouri completed four-lane segments from New London to Bowling Green in November 2000, and from Canton to La Grange in 2003.

In 2001, the Iowa Department of Transportation gave the Avenue of the Saints its own highway number: Highway 27 (Iowa 27). The number was added as an additional number to the existing routes; however, after the Donnellson bypass opened in 2004, Iowa Highway 394 was decommissioned and Iowa 27 is now a stand-alone highway south of the split with US 218. A new four-lane bridge across the Des Moines River was opened at the end of 2004, replacing an existing toll bridge operated by the Wayland Special Road District. A new four-lane road between the bridge and US 61 south of Wayland, Missouri opened on the same day; it was numbered by Missouri as Route 27 to match Iowa's number for the Avenue of the Saints.

In June 2005, a four-lane segment from the end of the Mount Pleasant bypass to the junction with Iowa Highway 16 east of Houghton was opened to four lanes of traffic. The segment of Iowa 27 between the split with US 218 and the Des Moines River bridge opened to four lanes on August 25, 2005. The last remaining segment in Iowa was opened to traffic on May 23, 2006.

In 2007, an interchange was installed at Route C in Moscow Mills, Missouri. This was later done to Route U and South Lincoln Drive as well.

On July 25, 2008, the final nine miles (14 km) of highway between the Lewis—Clark county line and Wayland, Missouri, was open to four-lane traffic. A ceremony was held at the intersection of US 61 and Route 27 to commemorate the completion of the four-lane highway in Missouri. The Avenue of the Saints is now complete from St. Paul to suburban St. Louis.

As a result of the narrow lanes and constant problems with the aging westbound structure, MODOT started studies for a new replacement of the westbound Daniel Boone bridge in around 2001 or 2002. Funding was finally unveiled in 2011, and in November 2012 a design-build contract was awarded to the Walsh-Alberici joint venture team with designer Burns & McDonnell. Construction started in 2013 on a girder bridge, located upstream of the two existing bridges. All four eastbound lanes were routed onto the new bridge on June 28, 2015. The new bridge also features a bike/pedestrian attachment, which connects the Katy Trail to the Monarch Levee Trail.

The Iowa Department of Transportation rebuilt the Avenue of the Saints interchange with I‑80 and I‑380/US 218/Iowa 27 in Coralville. As the Eastern Iowa region has grown, traffic has increased, and the previous arrangement of the interchange with cloverleaf ramps was deemed unsafe. The interchange was rebuilt as a turbine interchange, which would eliminate weaving. The project was completed in August 2023 after 5 years of the project.

== Future ==
The Missouri Department of Transportation (MoDot) has published initial maps for the Hannibal Expressway, a bypass around Hannibal, Missouri. According to the maps, the Hannibal Expressway would depart from US 61 south of Hannibal, travel in a northwesterly direction toward the Rocket Junction where it would intersect with US 36/I-72 and US 24 West. The Hannibal Expressway would then travel along the current US 24 East alignment and re-connect with US 61 four miles (6.4 km) north of the Rocket Junction. The "Hannibal Expressway" project is unfunded. There are seven stoplights along US 61 in Hannibal: Red Devil Road/Warren Barrett Drive, Market Street (Business 61), Highway MM (Business 36), West Ely Road, I‑72/US 36, Stardust Drive/Pirate Pride, and Route 168.

== Major intersections ==
The segment that concurs with US 61 is unsigned and has multiple at grade intersections.

State	County	Location	mi	km	Exit	Destinations	Notes
Missouri	St. Louis	Frontenac	0.000	0.000		I-64 east / US 40 east	Continuation east beyond interchange; southern end of I-64 and US 40 concurrencies
Missouri	St. Louis	Frontenac	0.000	0.000	28A	US 61 south / US 67 (Lindbergh Boulevard)	Southern terminus of the Avenue of the Saints; southern end of US 61 concurrency
Missouri	St. Louis	Frontenac	0.522	0.840	27	Spoede Road	
Missouri	St. Louis	Town and Country	2.060	3.315	26	Ballas Road	
Missouri	St. Louis	Town and Country	2.403– 2.390	3.867– 3.846	25	I-270 – Tulsa, Chicago, Memphis	
Missouri	St. Louis	Town and Country	4.081	6.568	24	Mason Road	
Missouri	St. Louis	Town and Country	5.036	8.105	23	Maryville Centre Road	No eastbound exit
Missouri	St. Louis	Town and Country	5.719	9.204	22	Route 141 (Woods Mill Road)	
Missouri	St. Louis	Chesterfield	6.836	11.001	21	Timberlake Manor Parkway	
Missouri	St. Louis	Chesterfield	7.951	12.796	20	Chesterfield Parkway	Westbound exit and eastbound entrance only
Missouri	St. Louis	Chesterfield	8.427	13.562	19B	Route 340 (Olive Boulevard, Clarkson Road)	
Missouri	St. Louis	Chesterfield	9.047	14.560	19A	Chesterfield Parkway	
Missouri	St. Louis	Chesterfield	11.119	17.894	17	Boone's Crossing	
Missouri	St. Louis	Chesterfield	11.913	19.172	16	Long Road	Westbound exit and eastbound entrance only
Missouri	St. Louis	Chesterfield	13.618	21.916	14	Spirit of Saint Louis Boulevard	Westbound exit and eastbound entrance only
Missouri	St. Louis	Chesterfield	14.512	23.355	14	Chesterfield Airport Road	Eastbound exit and westbound entrance only
Missouri	Missouri River		15.803	25.432	Daniel Boone Bridge		
Missouri	St. Charles	Weldon Spring	16.338	26.293	11	Research Park Circle	No westbound entrance
Missouri	St. Charles	Weldon Spring	17.534	28.218	10	Route 94 – St. Charles	Westbound exit via Exit 9
Missouri	St. Charles	O'Fallon	18.273	29.408	9	Route K	
Missouri	St. Charles	O'Fallon	21.998	35.402	6	Route DD (WingHaven Boulevard)	
Missouri	St. Charles		24.034	38.679	4	Route N	
Missouri	St. Charles	Lake St. Louis	25.229	40.602	2	Lake St. Louis Boulevard	
Missouri	St. Charles	Wentzville	26.834	43.185	1C	Prospect Road	
Missouri	St. Charles	Wentzville	28.267	45.491	1A-B	I-64 ends / I-70 / US 40 west – Kansas City, St. Louis	Northern end of I-64 and US 40 concurrencies; I-70 exits 210A-B; cloverleaf interchange
Missouri	St. Charles	Wentzville	28.662	46.127		Pitman Avenue	Northbound exit and southbound entrance only
Missouri	St. Charles	Wentzville	29.505	47.484		Route A (Wentzville Parkway)	
Missouri	St. Charles	Wentzville	31.825	51.217		Route P (Peine Road) – Flint Hill	
Missouri	Lincoln	Moscow Mills	37.023	59.583		Route U (Crossroads Boulevard)	
Missouri	Lincoln	Moscow Mills	39.709	63.905		Route C – Moscow Mills, Old Monroe	
Missouri	Lincoln	Troy	40.000	64.374		Lincoln Avenue South	
Missouri	Lincoln	Troy	42.557	68.489		Old Cap au Gris Road	Northbound exit and entrance only
Missouri	Lincoln	Troy	43.221	69.557		Route 47 – Troy, Winfield	
Missouri	Lincoln		49.005	78.866		Route K / Route V	Current at-grade intersection, future interchange
Missouri	Lincoln		52.226	84.050		Route E / Route B	Current at-grade intersection, future interchange
Missouri	Pike	Eolia	61.099	98.329		Route D / Route FF – Eolia	
Missouri	Pike	Bowling Green	72.799	117.159		US 61 Bus. / Route 161 – Ashley	
Missouri	Pike	Bowling Green	75.100	120.862		US 54 – Louisiana, Mexico	
Missouri	Pike		76.285	122.769		US 61 Bus. / Route UU – Bowling Green	
Missouri	Pike	Frankford	86.668	139.479		Route B / Route C / Route ZZ – Frankford	
Missouri	Ralls	New London	93.648	150.712		Route 19 / US 61 Bus. – Center	
Missouri	Ralls	New London	95.430	153.580		US 61 Bus.	
Missouri	Marion	Hannibal	103.463	166.508		US 36 Bus. / Route MM	Southern end of US 36 Bus. concurrency
Missouri	Marion	Hannibal	104.113	167.554		I-72 east / US 36 / Route 110 (CKC) / US 36 Bus. ends / Great River Road south – Monroe City, St. Joseph, Springfield	Northern end of US 36 Bus. concurrency; southern end of Great River Road concurrency; I-72 begins at interchange. Access to Downtown Hannibal, Mark Twain Historic District, and Hannibal Regional Hospital.
Missouri	Marion	Hannibal	105.126	169.184		Route 168 / Route W / Great River Road north	Northern end of Great River Road concurrency
Missouri	Marion	Barkley	111.689	179.746		US 24 – Monroe City	Southern end of US 24 concurrency
Missouri	Marion	Palmyra	113.413	182.521		US 61 Bus. – Palmyra	
Missouri	Marion	Palmyra	116.251	187.088		US 61 Bus. / Route 168 / Great River Road south – Palmyra	Southern end of Great River Road concurrency
Missouri	Marion		123.855	199.325		Route 6 west – Edina, Taylor	
Missouri	Marion	Taylor	124.922– 125.199	201.042– 201.488		US 24 east – Quincy, Illinois	Northern end of US 24 concurrency
Missouri	Lewis	La Grange	130.588	210.161		US 61 Bus. / Route B / Great River Road north – La Grange	Access to Wakonda State Park; northern end of Great River Road concurrency
Missouri	Lewis	La Grange	133.105	214.212		US 61 Bus. / Route C – La Grange	
Missouri	Lewis	Canton	138.464	222.836		US 61 Bus. / Route P – Canton	Access to Culver-Stockton College
Missouri	Lewis	Canton	139.205	224.029		Route 16 to Route 81 – Canton, Monticello	Access to Lewis County Port
Missouri	Lewis	Canton	142.220	228.881		US 61 Bus. / Route B / Great River Road south	Southern end of Great River Road concurrency
Missouri	Clark		155.658	250.507		US 61 north / Great River Road north / Route 27 begins – Keokuk	Northern end of US 61 and Great River Road concurrency; southern end of Route 27 concurrency
Missouri	Clark	Wayland	158.397	254.915		US 136 – Kahoka	
Des Moines River			165.784 0.000	266.803 0.000		Route 27 ends / Iowa 27 begins; Missouri–Iowa state line	
Iowa	Lee	Charleston Township	10.395	16.729	10 18	US 218 south – Keokuk	Southern end of US 218 concurrency; exit numbers follow US 218
Iowa	Lee	Donnellson	12.322	19.830	19	Iowa 2 – Donnellson, Fort Madison	
Iowa	Lee	Marion Township	22.409	36.064		Iowa 16 – Denmark, Houghton	
Iowa	Henry	Mount Pleasant	33.312	53.610	40	255th Street, Old Thresher's Grounds	
Iowa	Henry	Mount Pleasant	34.998	56.324	42	US 34 east / Iowa 163 east / US 34 Bus. / US 218 Bus. – Mount Pleasant, Burlington	Southern end of US 34 and Iowa 163 concurrencies; signed as Exits 42A (east) and 42B (west)
Iowa	Henry	Mount Pleasant	38.872	62.558	45	US 34 west / Iowa 163 west – Ottumwa	Northern end of US 34 and Iowa 163 concurrencies; northbound exit and southbound entrance only
Iowa	Henry	Mount Pleasant	38.872	62.558	45	US 218 Bus. (Iowa 438) to US 34 west / Iowa 163 west – Ottumwa	Southbound exit and northbound entrance only
Iowa	Henry	Olds	37.096	59.700		Iowa 78 – Olds, Winfield, Wayland	At-grade intersection
Iowa	Washington	Oregon Township	59.230	95.321	66	Iowa 92 – Washington, Columbus Junction	Also provides access to Ainsworth and Cotter
Iowa	Washington	Oregon Township	62.609	100.759	70	CR G36	
Iowa	Washington	Riverside	72.721	117.033	80	Iowa 22 – Kalona, Lone Tree	
Iowa	Johnson	Liberty Township	77.448	124.640	85	Hills	
Iowa	Johnson	West Lucas Township	81.622	131.358	89	CR F50 (Riverside Drive) – Iowa City Municipal Airport	
Iowa	Johnson	Iowa City	83.232	133.949	91	Iowa 1 – Kalona	
Iowa	Johnson	Iowa City	85.475	137.559	93	CR F46 (Melrose Avenue) – University Heights	
Iowa	Johnson	Coralville	88.847	142.985	97 0	I-80 / I-380 begins – Davenport, Des Moines	Southern end of I-380 concurrency; northbound exit number follow the mileage of US-218 and is signed as 97; southbound exit number follow the mileage of I-380 and is signed as 0
Iowa	Johnson	Coralville–North Liberty line	90.887	146.268	2	Forevergreen Road	
Iowa	Johnson	North Liberty	92.893	149.497	4	CR F28	
Iowa	Johnson	Jefferson Township	99.705	160.460	10	CR F12 – Swisher, Shueyville	
Iowa	Linn	Cedar Rapids	102.663	165.220	13	Ely, The Eastern Iowa Airport	
Iowa	Linn	Cedar Rapids	105.176	169.264	16	US 30 / US 151 / US 218 north – Mt. Vernon, Tama	Northern end of US 218 concurrency; northbound exits signed 16A (east) and 16B (west)
Iowa	Linn	Cedar Rapids	106.432	171.286	17	33rd Avenue SW – Hawkeye Downs	
Iowa	Linn	Cedar Rapids	107.176	172.483	18	Wilson Avenue SW	
Iowa	Linn	Cedar Rapids	108.262	174.231	19A	To US 151 Bus. / Diagonal Drive / 5th Avenue SW – Downtown Cedar Rapids	Northbound exit and southbound entrance only
Iowa	Linn	Cedar Rapids	108.594	174.765	19B-C	US 151 Bus. (1st Avenue W) / 1st Street W – Veterans Memorial Stadium, Kingston Stadium	No southbound entrance, northbound exit signed as Exit 19C
Iowa	Linn	Cedar Rapids	109.008	175.431	20A	To US 151 Bus. / 1st Street East – Downtown Cedar Rapids	Southbound exit and northbound entrance only
Iowa	Linn	Cedar Rapids	109.501	176.225	20B	7th Street E – Alliant Energy PowerHouse	Access to Mercy Medical Center and St. Luke's Hospital
Iowa	Linn	Cedar Rapids	110.412	177.691	21	H Avenue, J Avenue	
Iowa	Linn	Cedar Rapids	11.195	18.017	22	Coldstream–29th Street, Glass Road – 32nd Street	
Iowa	Linn	Cedar Rapids	112.220	180.601	23	42nd Street	Southbound exit from Exit 24
Iowa	Linn	Cedar Rapids	112.728– 113.208	181.418– 182.191	24	Iowa 100 (Collins Road) / Blairs Ferry Road	Signed as Exits 24A (Iowa 100) and 24B (Blairs Ferry Road) northbound
Iowa	Linn	Hiawatha	114.119	183.657	25	Boyson Road	
Iowa	Linn	Monroe Township	117.696	189.413	28	CR E34 – Toddville, Robins	
Iowa	Linn	Center Point	124.673	200.642	35	CR W36	
Iowa	Benton	Urbana	130.716	210.367	41	Urbana	
Iowa	Benton	Urbana	132.374	213.035	43	Iowa 150 – Vinton, Independence	
Iowa	Buchanan	Jefferson Township	138.803	223.382	49	Brandon	
Iowa	Buchanan	Jefferson Township	144.197	232.063	55	CR V65 – Jesup	
Iowa	Black Hawk	Fox Township	151.071	243.125	62	CR D38 – Gilbertville	
Iowa	Black Hawk	Poyner Township	153.862	247.617	65	US 20 east – Dubuque	Southern end of US 20 concurency
Iowa	Black Hawk	Poyner Township	155.298	249.928	66	Raymond, Gilbertville	
Iowa	Black Hawk	Evansdale	157.206	252.999	68	Evansdale Drive – Elk Run Heights	
Iowa	Black Hawk	Evansdale	159.474	256.649	70	River Forest Road	
Iowa	Black Hawk	Waterloo	160.282	257.949	71 232	I-380 north / US 218 – Waterloo, La Porte City	Northern end of I-380 concurrency; northbound signed as Exits 71A (north) and 71B (south); southbound signed as Exits 232A (south) and 232B (north)
Iowa	Black Hawk	Waterloo	162.064	260.817	230	Iowa 21 (Hawkeye Road) – Dysart	
Iowa	Black Hawk	Waterloo	163.572	263.244	229	Ansborough Avenue	
Iowa	Black Hawk	Waterloo	165.104	265.709	227	US 63 (Sergeant Road) – Hudson	
Iowa	Black Hawk	Hudson	167.164	269.024	225	US 20 west / Iowa 58 south – Cedar Falls	Northern end of US 20 concurrency; southern end of Iowa 58 concurrency
Iowa	Black Hawk	Cedar Falls	167.568	269.675		Ridgeway Avenue	At-grade intersection; future interchange
Iowa	Black Hawk	Cedar Falls	168.569	271.286	181	Viking Road	Former at-grade intersection; intersection rebuilt into single point urban interchange
Iowa	Black Hawk	Cedar Falls	169.715	273.130	182	Greenhill Road	At-grade intersection; future double-teardrop interchange
Iowa	Black Hawk	Cedar Falls	170.862	274.976	183	University Avenue (to Iowa 934)	
Iowa	Black Hawk	Cedar Falls	171.468– 171.658	275.951– 276.257	184	18th Street, Waterloo Road	Access to Sartori Memorial Hospital
Iowa	Black Hawk	Cedar Falls	172.945	278.328	—	US 218 south / Iowa 57 west / Iowa 58 ends – Waterloo, Waterloo Regional Airport	Northern end of Iowa 58 concurrency; southern end of US 218 concurrency
Iowa	Black Hawk	Cedar Falls	174.597	280.987	189	Lone Tree Road	
Iowa	Bremer	Waverly	184.363	296.703	198	US 218 Bus. (Iowa 116) – Waverly	Access to Waverly Health Center
Iowa	Bremer	Waverly	188.635	303.579	203	Iowa 3 – Waverly, Shell Rock	
Iowa	Bremer	Waverly	190.676	306.863	205	US 218 Bus. – Waverly Municipal Airport	
Iowa	Bremer	Plainfield	197.890	318.473	212	Iowa 188	
Iowa	Chickasaw	Nashua	205.194	330.228	220	Iowa 346 east / CR B60 west	
Iowa	Floyd	Charles City	214.416	345.069	218	US 18 east / US 218 Bus. / CR T64 – New Hampton	Southern end of US 18 concurrency
Iowa	Floyd	Charles City	217.992	350.824	214	Iowa 14 – Greene	
Iowa	Floyd	Charles City	220.116	354.242	212	US 218 Bus. / CR B35	
Iowa	Floyd	Floyd	222.552	358.163	209	US 218 north / CR T44 south – Osage, Charles City	Northern end of US 218 concurrency; exit construction from 2023-2024; formal intersection
Iowa	Floyd	Rock Grove Township	237.250	381.817	195	CR S70 – Nora Springs	
Iowa	Cerro Gordo	Portland Township	242.387	390.084	190	CR S56 (California Avenue)	
Iowa	Cerro Gordo	Mason City	246.439	396.605	186	US 18 Bus. / US 65 – Downtown Mason City, Rockwell	
Iowa	Cerro Gordo	Lake Township	249.449	401.449	183	CR S36 (Eisenhower Avenue)	
Iowa	Cerro Gordo	Lake Township	253.900	408.612	178 190	I-35 south – Des Moines	Southern end of I-35 concurrency
Iowa	Cerro Gordo	Clear Lake	256.349	412.554	193	I-35 Business Loop north / CR B35 – Mason City	
Iowa	Cerro Gordo	Clear Lake	257.219	413.954	194	US 18 west / I-35 Business Loop south / Iowa 122 – Mason City, Clear Lake	Northern end of US 18 concurrency, access to Mercy Medical Center - North Iowa
Iowa	Cerro Gordo	Lincoln Township	260.910	419.894	197	CR B20	
Iowa	Worth	Danville Township	266.831	429.423	203	Iowa 9 – Manly, Forest City	
Iowa	Worth	Brookfield Township	271.845	437.492	208	CR A38 – Joice, Kensett	
Iowa	Worth	Hartland Township	277.865	447.180	214	CR 105 – Lake Mills, Northwood	Former Iowa 105
			281.689 0.000	453.335 0.000	Iowa 27 ends; Iowa–Minnesota state line; northern end of Iowa 27 concurrency		
Minnesota	Freeborn	Freeman Township	2.492– 2.522	4.010– 4.059	2	CR 5	
Minnesota	Freeborn	Freeman Township	5.276	8.491	5	CR 13 – Twin Lakes, Glenville	
Minnesota	Freeborn	Albert Lea	7.987– 7.995	12.854– 12.867	8	I-35 BL north / US 65 – Glenville	
Minnesota	Freeborn	Albert Lea	11.498	18.504	11	CR 46	
Minnesota	Freeborn	Albert Lea	12.560– 12.654	20.213– 20.365	12	I-35 BL south / US 65 south	Southbound exit and northbound entrance
Minnesota	Freeborn	Bancroft Township	13.247	21.319	13	I-90 – La Crosse, Sioux Falls	Signed as Exits 13A (east) and 13B (west)
Minnesota	Freeborn	Clarks Grove	18.745	30.167	18	MN 251 east – Hollandale	
Minnesota	Freeborn	Geneva Township	22.963	36.955	22	CR 35 – Hartland, Geneva	
Minnesota	Steele	Summit Township	26.640	42.873	26	MN 30 – New Richland, Blooming Prairie	
Minnesota	Steele	Somerset Township	32.817	52.814	32	CR 4 – Hope	
Minnesota	Steele	Owatonna	39.981	64.343	40	US 14 / US 218 south – Waseca, Rochester, Austin	Former southern end of US 14 concurrency
Minnesota	Steele	Owatonna	41.766	67.216	41	Bridge Street	
Minnesota	Steele	Owatonna	42.509	68.412	42	CSAH 45 / CSAH 2	Signed as Exits 42A (east) and 42B (west); former northern end of US 14 concurrency
Minnesota	Steele	Owatonna	43.524– 43.548	70.045– 70.084	43	CSAH 34 (26th Street)	
Minnesota	Steele	Owatonna	45.520– 45.544	73.257– 73.296	45	CSAH 9 – Clinton Falls	
Minnesota	Steele	Medford	48.057	77.340	48	CSAH 12 / CSAH 23 – Medford	
Minnesota	Rice	Faribault	55.590	89.463	55	I-35 BL / CSAH 48 / Lyndale Avenue – Faribault	Northbound exit and southbound entrance only
Minnesota	Rice	Faribault	56.918	91.601	56	MN 60 – Faribault, Waterville	
Minnesota	Rice	Faribault	59.107	95.123	59	I-35 BL / MN 21 – Faribault, Le Center	
Minnesota	Rice	Forest Township	66.696	107.337	66	CSAH 1 – Montgomery, Dundas	
Minnesota	Rice	Webster Township	69.679	112.137	69	MN 19 – Northfield, New Prague	
Minnesota	Scott	New Market Township	76.841	123.664	76	CR 2 – Elko New Market	
Minnesota	Dakota	Lakeville	81.842	131.712	81	CSAH 70 – Farmington	
Minnesota	Dakota	Lakeville	84.340	135.732	84	CSAH 60 (185th Street West)	
Minnesota	Dakota	Lakeville	85.509	137.613	85	CSAH 5 / CSAH 50	
Minnesota	Dakota	Lakeville	85.953	138.328	–	Kenrick Avenue Park and Ride station	Buses only; northbound exit and entrance
Minnesota	Dakota	Lakeville	86.636	139.427	86	CSAH 46	
Minnesota	Dakota	Burnsville	87.824	141.339	87	Crystal Lake Road	Northbound exit and southbound entrance only
Minnesota	Dakota	Burnsville	88.268	142.054	88A	I-35W north – Minneapolis	Northbound exit and southbound entrance only
Minnesota	Dakota	Burnsville	88.268	142.054		I-35 ends / I-35E begins – St. Paul	Northbound exit and southbound entrance only; Northern end of I-35 concurrency and southern end of I-35E concurrency
Minnesota	Dakota	Burnsville	88.794– 88.848	142.900– 142.987	88B	CSAH 42	
Minnesota	Dakota	Apple Valley	90.615– 90.659	145.831– 145.902	90	CSAH 11	
Minnesota	Dakota	Eagan	92.629– 92.649	149.072– 149.104	92	MN 77 (Cedar Avenue) – Zoo	
Minnesota	Dakota	Eagan	93.772	150.911	93	CSAH 32 (Cliff Road)	
Minnesota	Dakota	Eagan	94.906	152.736	94	CSAH 30 (Diffley Road)	
Minnesota	Dakota	Eagan	97.123	156.304	97A	CSAH 31 (Pilot Knob Road)	
Minnesota	Dakota	Eagan	97.433	156.803	97B	CSAH 28 (Yankee Doodle Road)	Northbound exit is via Exit 97A
Minnesota	Dakota	Eagan	98.559	158.615	98	CSAH 26 (Lone Oak Road)	
Minnesota	Dakota	Mendota Heights	99.667– 99.684	160.398– 160.426	99	I-494	Signed as Exits 99A (east) and 99B (west)
Minnesota	Dakota	Mendota Heights	101.169– 101.183	162.816– 162.838	101	MN 62	Signed as Exits 101A (east) and 101B (west) southbound; formerly MN 110
Minnesota	Dakota	Mendota Heights	102.590	165.103	102	MN 13 (Sibley Highway) / Great River Road (National Route)	Southern end of Great River Road concurrency
Minnesota	Mississippi River		102.630– 102.896	165.167– 165.595	Lexington Bridge		
Minnesota	Ramsey	Saint Paul	103.346– 103.364	166.319– 166.348	103A	Shepard Road / Great River Road (National Route)	Northbound exit and southbound entrance; northern end of Great River Road concurrency
Minnesota	Ramsey	Saint Paul	103.688– 103.692	166.870– 166.876	103B	MN 5 (West 7th Street)	
Minnesota	Ramsey	Saint Paul	104.464	168.119	104A	Randolph Avenue (CR 38)	
Minnesota	Ramsey	Saint Paul	104.599– 104.639	168.336– 168.400	104B	Ayd Mill Road	Northbound exit and southbound entrance
Minnesota	Ramsey	Saint Paul	105.014– 105.038	169.004– 169.042	104C	Victoria Street	Southbound exit and northbound entrance
Minnesota	Ramsey	Saint Paul	105.562	169.886	105	St. Clair Avenue	Southbound exit and northbound entrance
Minnesota	Ramsey	Saint Paul	106.281– 106.444	171.043– 171.305	106A	Grand Avenue	Northbound exit and southbound entrance
Minnesota	Ramsey	Saint Paul	106.980	172.168	106B	Kellogg Boulevard	Northbound exit and southbound entrance
Minnesota	Ramsey	Saint Paul	107.450	172.924	106C	11th Street – State Capitol	Northbound exit and southbound entrance
Minnesota	Ramsey	Saint Paul	107.497– 107.614	173.000– 173.188	107	I-94 / US 10 east / US 52 south / 10th Street, Wacouta Street, US 12 – Minneapolis	Signed as Exits 107A (east) and 107B (west)
Minnesota	Ramsey	Saint Paul	107.497– 107.614	173.000– 173.188		I-35E north / US 10 west	Continuation north beyond interchange; northern end of I-35E concurrency
1.000 mi = 1.609 km; 1.000 km = 0.621 mi: Concurrency terminus; HOV only; Incomplete access; Route transition; Unopened
