= Interstate 35E (Minnesota) =

Interstate Highway in Minnesota, United States

Interstate 35E
- I-35E highlighted in red

Route information
- Maintained by MnDOT
- Length: 39.340 mi (63.312 km)
- NHS: Entire route
- Restrictions: Trucks over 9,000 lb (4,100 kg) gross weight prohibited between MN 5 and I-94

Major junctions
- South end: I-35 / I-35W in Burnsville
- MN 77 in Eagan; I-494 in Mendota Heights; MN 62 in Mendota Heights; MN 13 in Lilydale; MN 5 in Saint Paul; I-94 / US 10 / US 52 in Saint Paul; I-694 / US 10 in Little Canada
- North end: I-35 / I-35W in Columbus, near Forest Lake

Location
- Country: United States
- State: Minnesota
- Counties: Dakota, Ramsey, Anoka

Highway system
- Interstate Highway System; Main; Auxiliary; Suffixed; Business; Future; Minnesota Trunk Highway System; Interstate; US; State; Legislative; Scenic
| ← I-35 | → I-35W |

Interstate 35E (I-35E) is an Interstate Highway in the US state of Minnesota, passing through downtown Saint Paul. It is one of two through routes for I-35 through the Twin Cities of Minneapolis and Saint Paul, the other being I-35W through Minneapolis. Thus, both ends of I-35E are shared with I-35W and I-35.

During the early years of the Interstate Highway System, branching Interstates with directional suffixes, such as N, S, E, and W, were common nationwide. On every other Interstate nationwide, these directional suffixes have been phased out by redesignating the suffixed route numbers with a loop or spur route number designation (such as I-270 in Maryland, which was once I-70S) or, in some cases, were assigned a different route number (such as I-76, which was once I-80S). In the case of I-35 in the Twin Cities area, since neither branch is clearly the main route and both branches return to a unified Interstate beyond the cities of Minneapolis and Saint Paul, officials at the American Association of State Highway and Transportation Officials (AASHTO) have allowed the suffixes of E and W in Minnesota to remain in the present day. I-35 also splits into I-35E and I-35W in Dallas–Fort Worth, Texas, for similar reasons as the I-35 split in the Minneapolis–Saint Paul area.

Similar to the Texas split, the Minnesota version of I-35E continues the exit numbers of I-35, while those of I-35W begin with 1 just north of the split. I-35E also carries the legislative route of I-35—unsigned legislative route 390—through the Twin Cities. On the other hand, the portion of I-35E through the West Seventh neighborhood of Saint Paul is a controversial four-lane parkway that heavy trucks are prohibited from using.

I-35E in Minnesota is 39 miles (63 km) in length.

== Route description ==
The southern terminus of I-35E is at exit 88A in Burnsville, where I-35 splits into I-35E and I-35W. While I-35W heads north into Minneapolis, I-35E takes a northeasterly path into Saint Paul. There is no access between I-35E and I-35W here, but Dakota County Road 42 (exit 88B), immediately to the north, connects the two Interstates in Burnsville. Major interchanges south of Saint Paul include Minnesota State Highway 77 (MN 77, signed as Cedar Avenue—exit 92) at Apple Valley–Eagan and I-494 (exits 99A and 99B) in Mendota Heights. Between exits 94 and 97, the highway deviates from its relatively straight path to avoid Blackhawk Lake. As it crosses I-494, I-35E turns more to the north, crossing MN 62 (exits 101A and 101B) and MN 13 (Great River Road, exit 102) in Mendota Heights before crossing the Mississippi River on the Lexington Bridge into the city of Saint Paul. This portion of I-35E is four lanes wide (two in each direction), except between MN 77 and MN 62, where it carries six lanes. The Lexington Bridge carries six lanes—four throughlanes and the exit and entrance lanes for MN 13—as well as a bicycle and pedestrian path. The bridge has an innovative automatic anti-icing system that sprays potassium acetate onto the bridge surface to prevent frost and ice formation in inclement weather.

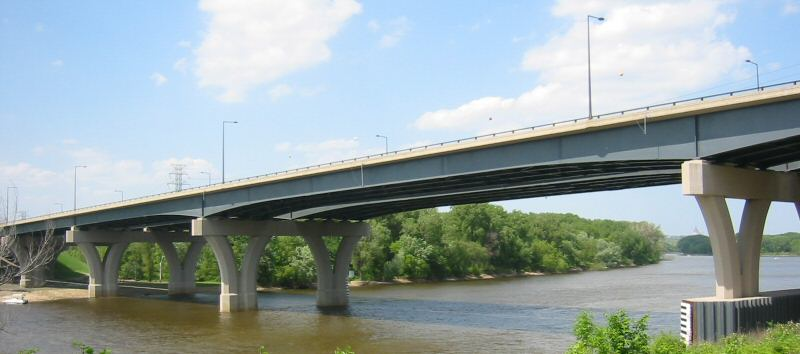
The new Lexington Bridge, completed in 2004

The auxiliary lanes from MN 13 leave at the first exit in Saint Paul, a half interchange with Shepard Road (exit 103A) with ramps toward the bridge. Shepard Road is a four-lane roadway with minimal intersections that follows the Mississippi River northeast into downtown Saint Paul. Immediately after Shepard Road is MN 5 (7th Street West, exit 103B), which leads northeast to downtown through the heart of the West Seventh neighborhood. The portion of I-35E between MN 5 and downtown is a mostly sunken four-lane parkway with a speed limit of 45 mph (72 km/h) (this portion is sometimes referred to as the "practice freeway" by locals), a ban on trucks over 9,000 pounds (4,100 kg) gross vehicle weight, and median landscaping. This parkway was built instead of a typical six-lane freeway because of local opposition. Major interchanges on this section include Ayd Mill Road (exit 104B), a sunken four-lane road to the northwest, and Kellogg Boulevard (exit 106B), which extends in both directions as part of a loop around downtown.

The four lanes of I-35E pass through Downtown Saint Paul in the center of the six lanes of I-94/U.S. Highway 52 (US 52), with a short overlap occupying the blocks between 11th and 12th streets. Despite this short overlap, there is no weaving between the two highways, since an exit in each direction of I-35E—exit 107A from I-35E north to I-94 east/US 52 south and exit 107B from I-35E south to I-94 west/US 52 north—takes traffic that would move to the right in the overlap instead to the right of the entire roadway. There are no interchanges on the common segment, and no direct access from I-35E north to I-94 west/US 52 north or I-94 east/US 52 south to I-35E south. Kellogg Boulevard provides an indirect connection; Ayd Mill Road, further west, nears I-94/US 52 but does not connect without several turns and traffic lights. Unlike the west split of I-35E and I-94/US 52, all ramps are present at the east split; among other uses, the I-35E south to I-94 east/US 52 north and I-94 west/US 52 north to I-35E north ramps carry traffic following US 10, which overlaps I-35E north of downtown, and truck traffic using the nearby Lafayette Freeway (US 52) to avoid the parkway through the West Seventh neighborhood.

From Downtown Saint Paul north to the junction with I-694 west (exit 113) in Little Canada, where US 10 also leaves I-35E, the highway carries three lanes of traffic in each direction, in addition to a single MnPASS HOV lane. Major interchanges here include Cayuga Street (exit 108), and MN 36 (exits 111A and 111B). An overlap of about one mile (1.6 km) exists between the two interchanges with I-694 (exits 113 and 114). Heading northbound on I-35E, the four lanes split into three for I-35E northbound and two for I-694 westbound, and then three lanes from I-694 eastbound enter on the right. These six lanes then split into three on the left for I-35E northbound and three on the right for I-694 eastbound; after the turn north, a lane joins on the right from I-694 westbound traffic. The configuration in the other direction, where I-35E southbound and I-694 westbound merge, is similar, but with only five total lanes instead of six where the freeways overlap. A four-year construction project, called "Unweave the Weave", beginning in 2004, was completed in 2008 and eliminated weaving where previously three I-35E lanes were inside three I-694 lanes, and left lane onramps existed.

I-35E is four lanes wide north of I-694; the third lane added northbound from the I-694 westbound ramp exits immediately onto County Road E (exit 115) in Vadnais Heights. Other than the northern terminus of I-35E (exit 127) in Columbus near Forest Lake, where it merges with I-35W to reform I-35, there are only four interchanges on I-35E north of I-694 between Vadnais Heights and Columbus, all for county roads.

== History ==
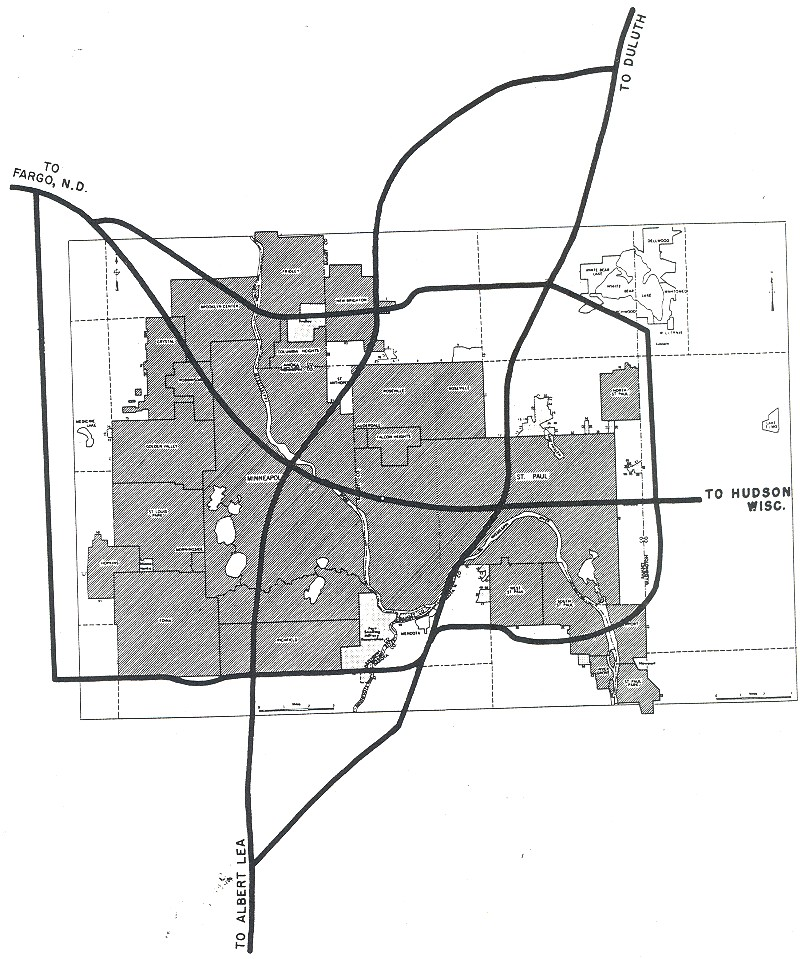
1955 plan for I-35E and other Twin Cities Area Interstates

Early plans for the Interstate Highway System include a route along roughly the same alignment as the present I-35 through the Twin Cities area but are not detailed enough to show exactly how the cities would be served. When preliminary urban routes were laid out in 1955, a split alignment was chosen to serve both cities equally. South of the Twin Cities, I-35 followed the corridor of old US 65, which had followed Lyndale Avenue between Burnsville and Downtown Minneapolis. I-35E was located parallel to MN 13, which cut northeast to Saint Paul from old US 65 south of the Minnesota River. North of the metropolitan area, I-35 closely paralleled US 61, which passed through Saint Paul; I-35W paralleled old US 8 from Minneapolis northeast through New Brighton and then to the present day I-35E/I-35W split at Columbus near Forest Lake, near where old US 8 had joined US 61. The Minnesota Legislature defined I-35E as part of unmarked Legislative Route 390, which stretched south to the Iowa state line and north to the city of Duluth along I-35.

I-35E was completed north of downtown Saint Paul in 1970. The first section to open ran north from Maryland Avenue in Saint Paul to I-694 in Little Canada; this was completed in the early 1960s, concurrently with I-694 west to old MN 49 (Rice Street). Later that decade, I-35E was extended south to Downtown Saint Paul, opening first to Pennsylvania Avenue and then to I-94, including the I-35E/I-94 concurrency (and I-94 in both directions). In 1970, I-35E was extended north along the I-35E/I-694 concurrency in Little Canada–Vadnais Heights and also extended northbound to its northern terminus at Columbus near Forest Lake; the adjacent sections of I-35, I-35W, and I-694 opened at about the same time.

The southern half of I-35E in the metro area took a lot longer to build. Its first section—a short stretch from MN 110 north to MN 5, including the Lexington Bridge over the Mississippi River—opened in the mid-1960s. Even though the connecting piece of I-35W and I-35 at the southern terminus of I-35E in Burnsville opened in the mid-1960s, it was not until the mid-1980s that I-35E was completed south of MN 110 at Mendota Heights and southbound through Eagan and Apple Valley, where there had been a missing link of I-35E for 20 years. Construction was delayed by opposition from nearby residents in Burnsville and from environmentalists over the proposed alignment across Blackhawk Lake. The final plan involved a new alignment avoiding the lake, as well as a less complicated interchange at I-494 in Mendota Heights, eliminating access to MN 55 that was part of the earlier plans.

=== Controversy through the West Seventh neighborhood of Saint Paul ===
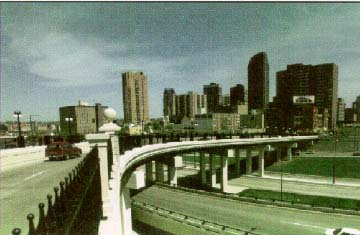
The St. Peter Street bridge over the I-94 overlap

The missing piece through the West Seventh neighborhood of Saint Paul, from MN 5 (7th Street West) northeast to I-94 in Downtown Saint Paul, was held up by controversy. Construction began in 1964 and was planned for completion in the 1970s as a typical six-lane freeway, but, in late 1969, a group of neighbors in the area had formed "Residents in Protest 35E" (R.I.P. 35E) to oppose the completion of I-35E. The group convinced the city to drop its support, and, in August, it filed a joint lawsuit against the Minnesota Highway Department (MHD) and the US Department of Transportation along with four neighborhood associations and eight citizens. The parties quickly reached an agreement, favorable to the plaintiffs, to halt construction pending an environmental impact statement (EIS).

The Saint Paul City Council decided in late 1974 to support I-35E, possibly due to the influence of proponents. R.I.P. 35E proposed an alternative to the original plan and convinced the city council to go along with it. The plan included a four-lane boulevard expansion of Pleasant Avenue (the street chosen for the I-35E alignment), with another route, such as Shepard Road or the nearby Lafayette Freeway, forming part of I-35E. The group opposed any direct connection of this parkway to I-94 near the State Capitol, where I-35E and I-94 were to merge. The EIS was completed in early 1975, identifying noise pollution, air pollution, vibrations, and slope stability as the main concerns. In addition to the nearby location of historic districts, hospitals were worried about the effects of vibrations on sensitive operations; MHD solved this problem while the report was being developed. The EIS identified the primary benefit of completing I-35E as connecting Downtown Saint Paul to the Interstate Highway System and determined that the original Pleasant Avenue corridor was the best choice but with minor changes, such as lowering the freeway below Grand Avenue and Ramsey Street.

A bill passed by the Minnesota Legislature on May 31, 1975, imposed a moratorium on building I-35E, as well as other area freeways, such as the canceled I-335 project and the MN 55 (Hiawatha Avenue) expansion project. This law defined several new legislative routes, which "may be added by order of the commissioner of transportation to the trunk highway system" (as opposed to other such routes, which were added to that system by the legislature):

Legislative Route No. 380. Beginning at a point on Route No. 390 [I-35E] at its intersection with Shepard Road in the city of Saint Paul; thence extending in a northeasterly direction generally following along the course of Shepard Road to a point on Route No. 112 [Lafayette Freeway]; thence extending in a northeasterly direction to a point on Route No. 392 [I-94] easterly of the downtown area of Saint Paul; providing a connector route between Route No. 390 and Routes No. 112 and 392;

Legislative Route No. 381. Beginning at a point on Route No. 112 [Lafayette Freeway], northerly of the Lafayette Street bridge in the city of Saint Paul; thence extending in a northwesterly direction to a point on Route No. 390 [I-35E], southerly of Maryland Avenue in the city of Saint Paul; providing a connector route between Route No. 112 and Route No. 390; and

Legislative Route No. 382. Beginning at a point on Route No. 390 [I-35E] at its junction with Route No. 111 [MN 5], thence extending in a general northerly direction, within the corridor of the right of way already acquired on the effective date of this act, for Route No. 390, to a point on Short Line Road; thence extending in a northeasterly direction within said corridor of right of way to the intersection of Pleasant Avenue and Kellogg Boulevard in the city of Saint Paul.

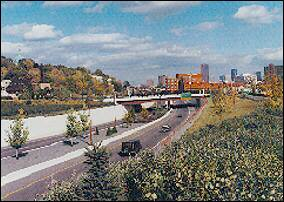
The parkway at Ramsey Street

Legislative Routes 380 and 381 provided for an alternate alignment of I-35E along Shepard Road and a northerly extension of the Lafayette Freeway, while Legislative Route 382 was a "four-lane parkway facility" that MHD could build along the original alignment of I-35E, but without a connection to I-94. The city announced its support of the parkway in August 1976.

An act passed on April 5, 1978, added a condition to the definition of Legislative Route 390 (I-35E):

Legislative Route No. 390 [I-35E] shall not include any portion of Legislative Route No. 382 [the parkway] as designated by section 161.117 or any portion of any route connecting Route No. 382 to Route No. 392 [I-94], nor shall it include any portion of trunk highway marked number 3 from trunk highway marked number 110 in Dakota County to East Seventh Street in the city of Saint Paul.

At the time, old MN 3 was marked along the nearby Lafayette Freeway (now US 52) from the late 1970s to 1994.

It also allowed a connection from the parkway to I-94, but this link could not be controlled access. The Metropolitan Council was to complete a draft EIS for the parkway and I-35E by September 1, 1979, with the cooperation of the Minnesota Department of Transportation (MnDOT) and Saint Paul. There was widespread support for a 45-mile-per-hour (72 km/h) parkway, with landscaping and a truck restriction, but the nonconnection to I-94 jeopardized federal Interstate funding since it could no longer be part of the continuous I-35E. Two notable alternatives came out of the draft EIS—a parkway with or without an I-94 connection. The parkway with a connection would provide the same level of service as a typical freeway.

R.I.P. 35E and other citizens' groups continued to oppose a direct connection, arguing that it would be no different from a typical freeway, since drivers would be more likely to exceed the speed limit if it was a continuous roadway to I-94. Saint Paul changed its mind again in September 1981, supporting a direct connection, along with MnDOT and the Metropolitan Council. A bill passed in March 1982 removed the stipulation that the parkway shall not connect to I-94 and allowed Route 390 (I-35E) to use Route 382 (the parkway). The final EIS was approved at about that time, and several groups, including R.I.P. 35E, filed suit in early 1983.

The suit alleged that the EIS focused almost exclusively on the Pleasant Avenue alignment and that it did not consider the effect of a direct connection on speed limit compliance; faster traffic would mean more noise. Judge Paul Magnuson ruled in February 1984 that the EIS was valid, stating that the Pleasant Avenue alternative was the only reasonable one that would meet goals. This court order has been interpreted as a legal contract, prohibiting the state from raising the speed limit or allowing trucks. Construction went forward, and I-35E was opened from MN 5 north to Saint Clair Avenue in 1984, using original bridges that had been built for three lanes in each direction. Further extensions, including all new bridges, were opened to Grand Avenue in 1986, to Kellogg Boulevard in November 1988, and to I-94 on October 15, 1990, 26 years after construction began. The 1990 opening ceremony of I-35E in downtown Saint Paul was attended by a group of highway experts from the Soviet Union, and both the US and Soviet national anthems were played.

=== Later changes ===
The original plans for the I-94 overlap in Downtown Saint Paul did not include the right-side ramps that eliminate weaving. The ramp from I-35E northbound to I-94 eastbound was added when I-35E was finally completed in 1990, and a five-year construction project that was completed in 1992 added the ramp from I-35E southbound to I-94 westbound, as well as a direct ramp from I-35E southbound to the Lafayette Freeway (US 52) to avoid weaving across I-94 east. This project was done because the old Spaghetti Junction at the east split of I-35E and I-94 would not be able to handle the extra load from the completed I-35E parkway.

When the first piece of the parkway opened in 1984, unused provisions, pending more study, were added for a direct link to Ayd Mill Road, a sunken four-lane road with minimal intersections that leads northwest from I-35E. The ramps were built and temporarily opened in 1992 for high-occupancy vehicles, due to the closure of the nearby Lafayette Bridge (US 52) for reconstruction. The ramps were reopened on June 12, 2002, as a test, and remain open as of 2017. A controversial extension of Ayd Mill Road to I-94 remains on the table.

The 1964 Lexington Bridge across the Mississippi River was replaced by a new bridge, built from 2001 to 2004, due to deterioration of the old structure including cracks in steel beams.

Unweave the Weave, a project to eliminate weaving at the I-694 overlap in Little Canada and Vadnais Heights, was started in 2004 and completed in 2008. The project was designed around several factors, a few of which included increasing freeway traffic capacity, increasing driver safety, and eliminating weaving and lane changes (eliminating "geometric deficiencies"), hence the name of the project, "Unweave the Weave". This weaving was the case for most drivers prior to 2005, before most of the road reconstruction work on the interchanges was done. As a result of lane changing and constant congestion, many accidents occurred on the interchange after its completion in the early 1970s. The current layout of the two Interstates now provides for safer exits and entrances, minimal congestion, and better road surface durability. The project also realigned the two Interstates to improve the infrastructure of the highway from an asphalt surface to a complete concrete surface. Numerous bridges were rebuilt, including the residential streets of Edgerton Street and Labore Road in Vadnais Heights.

The Minnesota Department of Transportation (MnDOT) updated the overlapped section between I-694 and I-35E to increase the number of lanes from six (three in each direction) to 12 (six in each direction) and eliminated the requirement to change lanes through the area. The section was rebuilt in concrete instead of asphalt and noise walls were added.

The 1965 bridge just north of Downtown Saint Paul carrying a daily traffic volume of 148,000 vehicles over Cayuga Street and the BNSF Railway line was rated by MnDOT as meeting minimum tolerable limits in 2006. Its superstructure and substructure were described as poor with advanced section loss, deterioration, spalling, or scour. As the fourth busiest bridge in the state, it was scrutinized following the collapse of the I-35W Mississippi River Bridge in nearby Minneapolis on August 1, 2007. The bridge was replaced in a construction project that finished in late 2016.

== Transit ==
The majority of the I-35E corridor is served by Metro Transit and MVTA commuter buses. MVTA buses serve the corridor from St. Paul to the Blackhawk Park & Ride in Eagan and Metro Transit buses cover the corridor from St. Paul to the County Road 14 Park & Ride in Lino Lakes.

== Exit list ==
Exit numbers and mileposts increase numerically from the south end, continuing the numbers used on I-35.

| County | Location | mi | km | Exit | Destinations | Notes |
|---|---|---|---|---|---|---|
| Dakota | Burnsville | 88.268 | 142.054 | | I-35 south – Albert Lea I-35W north | I-35E south and I-35W south merge into I-35; no access to I-35W from I-35E |
| Dakota | Burnsville | 88.794– 88.848 | 142.900– 142.987 | 88B | CSAH 42 | Access to M Health Fairview |
| Dakota | Apple Valley | 90.615– 90.659 | 145.831– 145.902 | 90 | CSAH 11 | |
| Dakota | Eagan | 92.629– 92.649 | 149.072– 149.104 | 92 | MN 77 (Cedar Avenue) – Zoo | MN 77 exit 2 |
| Dakota | Eagan | 93.772 | 150.911 | 93 | CSAH 32 (Cliff Road) | |
| Dakota | Eagan | 94.906 | 152.736 | 94 | CSAH 30 (Diffley Road) | |
| Dakota | Eagan | 97.123 | 156.304 | 97A | CSAH 31 (Pilot Knob Road) | Access to Eagan Transit Station |
| Dakota | Eagan | 97.433 | 156.803 | 97B | CSAH 28 (Yankee Doodle Road) | Northbound exit is via exit 97A |
| Dakota | Eagan | 98.559 | 158.615 | 98 | CSAH 26 (Lone Oak Road) | |
| Dakota | Mendota Heights | 99.667– 99.684 | 160.398– 160.426 | 99 | I-494 | Signed as exits 99A (east) and 99B (west); I-494 exit 70 |
| Dakota | Mendota Heights | 101.169– 101.183 | 162.816– 162.838 | 101 | MN 62 | Previously MN 110; signed as exits 101A (east) and 101B (west) southbound |
| Dakota | Mendota Heights | 102.590 | 165.103 | 102 | MN 13 (Sibley Highway) / Great River Road (National Route) | Southern end of Great River Road overlap |
| Mississippi River | | 102.630– 102.896 | 165.167– 165.595 | Lexington Bridge | | |
| Ramsey | Saint Paul | 103.346– 103.364 | 166.319– 166.348 | 103A | Great River Road (National Route) (Shepard Road) | Northbound exit and southbound entrance; northern end of Great River Road overlap |
| Ramsey | Saint Paul | 103.688– 103.692 | 166.870– 166.876 | 103B | MN 5 (West 7th Street) | |
| Ramsey | Saint Paul | 104.464 | 168.119 | 104A | CSAH 38 (Randolph Avenue) | |
| Ramsey | Saint Paul | 104.599– 104.639 | 168.336– 168.400 | 104B | Ayd Mill Road | Northbound exit and southbound entrance |
| Ramsey | Saint Paul | 105.014– 105.038 | 169.004– 169.042 | 104C | Victoria Street | Southbound exit and northbound entrance |
| Ramsey | Saint Paul | 105.562 | 169.886 | 105 | St. Clair Avenue | Southbound exit and northbound entrance |
| Ramsey | Saint Paul | 106.281– 106.444 | 171.043– 171.305 | 106A | Grand Avenue | Northbound exit and southbound entrance; access to Children's Minnesota and United Hospital |
| Ramsey | Saint Paul | 106.980 | 172.168 | 106B | Kellogg Boulevard | Northbound exit and southbound entrance |
| Ramsey | Saint Paul | 107.450 | 172.924 | 106C | 11th Street – State Capitol | Northbound exit and southbound entrance |
| Ramsey | Saint Paul | 107.497 | 173.000 | 107B | I-94 west – Minneapolis | South end of I-94 overlap; southbound exit and northbound entrance; unmarked US 12 west, unmarked US 52 west |
| Ramsey | Saint Paul | 107.614 | 173.188 | 107A | I-94 east / US 10 east / US 52 south / 10th Street, Wacouta Street | North end of I-94 overlap; south end of US 10 overlap; unmarked US 12 east |
| Ramsey | Saint Paul | 108.042– 108.074 | 173.877– 173.928 | 107C | University Avenue – State Capitol | Southbound exit only; access to Regions Hospital |
| Ramsey | Saint Paul | 108.279– 108.311 | 174.258– 174.310 | 108 | CSAH 33 (Pennsylvania Avenue) | Closed; had no southbound entrance |
| Ramsey | Saint Paul | | | 108 | Cayuga Street | Opened partially in 2013; completed in 2016 |
| Ramsey | Saint Paul | 109.400 | 176.062 | 109 | CSAH 31 (Maryland Avenue) | |
| Ramsey | Saint Paul–Maplewood city line | 110.339– 110.420 | 177.573– 177.704 | 110A | CSAH 30 (Larpenteur Avenue) / Wheelock Parkway | |
| Ramsey | Maplewood | 110.905– 110.931 | 178.484– 178.526 | 110B | Roselawn Avenue | |
| Ramsey | Little Canada | 111.704– 111.742 | 179.770– 179.831 | 111 | MN 36 – Stillwater, Minneapolis | Signed as exits 111A (east) and 111B (west) |
| Ramsey | Little Canada | 112.560 | 181.148 | 112 | CSAH 21 (Little Canada Road) | |
| Ramsey | Little Canada | 113.531 | 182.710 | 113 | I-694 west / US 10 west | North end of US 10 overlap; south end of I-694 overlap, I-694 exit 46. |
| Ramsey | Vadnais Heights | 114.181 | 183.757 | 114 | I-694 east | North end of I-694 overlap, I-694 exit 47 |
| Ramsey | Vadnais Heights | 115.441 | 185.784 | 115 | CSAH 15 (County Road E) | |
| Ramsey | White Bear Lake | 117.470 | 189.050 | 117 | CSAH 96 | |
| Ramsey | White Bear Township | 120.570 | 194.039 | 120 | CSAH 60 / CR 81 / County Road J | Full Interchange open in November 2026 |
| Anoka | Lino Lakes | 123.570 | 198.867 | 123 | CSAH 14 | |
| Anoka | Columbus | 127.608 | 205.365 | | I-35 north – Duluth I-35W south | I-35E north and I-35W north merge into I-35; no access to I-35W from I-35E |
1.000 mi = 1.609 km; 1.000 km = 0.621 mi: Closed/former; Concurrency terminus; Incomplete access
