= River to River Greenway =

Trail in Minnesota, USA

Coordinates: 44°53′40″N 93°5′27″W

The River to River Greenway is a paved multi-use trail in development in Dakota County, Minnesota, United States. Phase II, completed in October 2007, is a 1.3-mile (2.1 km) segment that parallels Minnesota State Highway 110 from Charlton Street to Dodd Road.

Municipalities along trail corridor

- South St. Paul, MN
- West St. Paul, MN
- Mendota Heights, MN
- Lilydale, MN

Trail connections

- Valley View Park trail
