= Shepard Road/Warner Road =

Highway in Saint Paul, Minnesota

Coordinates: 44°56′58″N 93°4′32″W

Shepard Road Warner Road
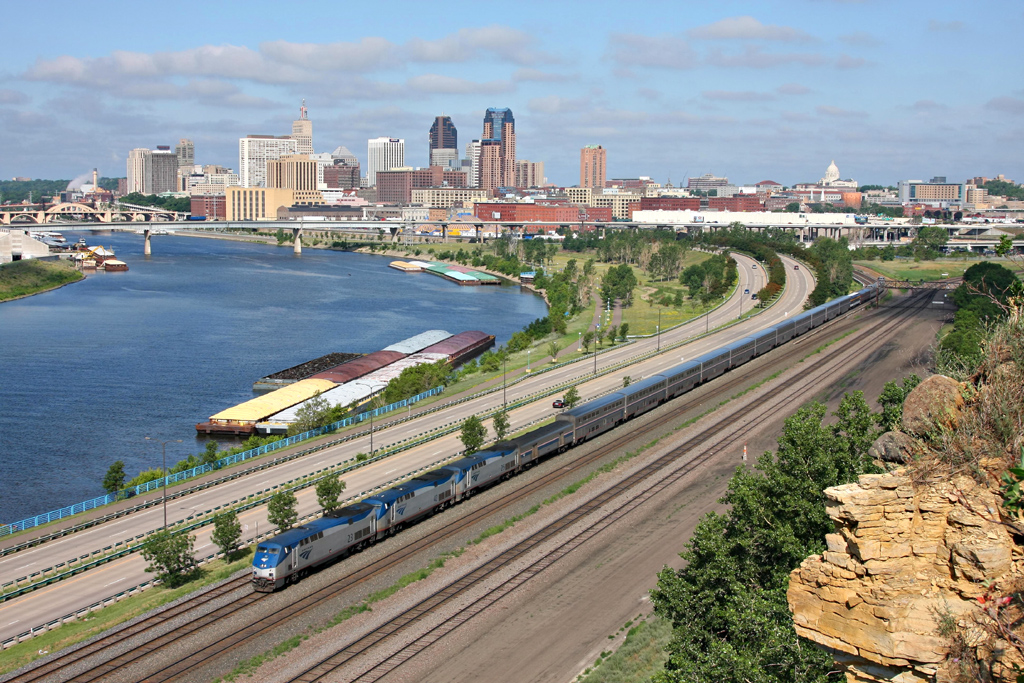
- Warner Road east of downtown Saint Paul, Minnesota, runs between the Mississippi River and train tracks
- Interactive map of Shepard Road; Warner Road
- West end: MN 5
- East end: US 61 / US 10

Shepard Road and Warner Road are the names given to a four-lane road running along the banks of the Mississippi River in Saint Paul, Minnesota. Shepard Road (County Road 37) runs from the southwestern boundary of the county to downtown Saint Paul. From downtown east the road is known as Warner Road (County Road 36). It runs to a junction with US Highways 61 and 10.

The road is a four-lane highway which closely follows the Mississippi River and connects some of the most historic parts of the Twin Cities which grew up along the river. As its southern boundary over almost its entire length is the Mississippi River, there is cross traffic at only a handful of intersections, and few signal lights. It is a principal arterial route into downtown Saint Paul.

Much of the road is atop or alongside wooded riverside bluffs, and it adjoins several parks and nature areas. In downtown Saint Paul it is on the riverbottoms.

== Name ==
Shepard Road was named for George M. Shepard, chief engineer of St. Paul Department of Public Works from the 1920s to 1950s. Warner Road is named after Richmond Warner, a former chairman of the St. Paul Port Authority.

== Routing ==
From the west, Shepard Road starts at Minnesota State Highway 5 on the east bank of the Mississippi River at the east end of the Fort Road Bridge, directly across the river from Fort Snelling. This fort, now in Fort Snelling State Park, was the first permanent Euro-American settlement in Minnesota at the Mississippi's confluence with the Minnesota River. The road curves from east-southeast to east by northeast on the river bluffs above Pike Island in the Mississippi, where Lieutenant Zebulon Pike purchased from the Mdewakanton tribe land on which Fort Snelling later was built. The island was the site of a prison camp for Indians captured in the Dakota War of 1862 and now part of Fort Snelling State Park. Adjacent to the park to the east and adjoining the road is Crosby Regional Park, a Saint Paul city park on the river bottom maintained as a nature area.

Continuing northeast, the road passes under the Lexington Bridge which carries Interstate 35E over the Mississippi. From that intersection to Warner Road's eastern terminus it is part of the National Highway System and is also a segment of the Great River Road.

The road passes over the approach track to the Omaha Road Bridge Number 15, railroad swing bridge across the Mississippi. The road curves inland as it descends from the bluffs to the riverbank near downtown Saint Paul; it was relocated inland to make way for riverfront development. Along the way it passes under the High Bridge.

As the road reaches downtown it rejoins the river bank and is located atop the levee where steamboats once stopped and where the city began. Here it passes under a succession of bridges, the Wabasha Street Bridge, St. Paul Union Pacific Vertical-lift Rail Bridge, the Robert Street Bridge, and east of the city center, the Lafayette Bridge.

In downtown, next to the Saint Paul Union Depot, the road's name changes from Shepard Road to Warner Road. As Warner Road heads east, it is located between former station tracks of the depot and the Mississippi. The road southeast between the Mississippi and Indian Mounds Park, a burial ground for Native Americans in Pre-contact times. The road turns to the east to its end at US Highways 61 and 10.

== History ==
Since before 1916, there was a proposal to build a "Reserve Boulevard" along the modern alignment of Shepard Road between Mississippi River Boulevard and Randolph Avenue/Duke Street.

The construction of Shepard Road displaced the working class Italian American community in the Upper Levee area of West Seventh. Flooding in the early 1950s led the city to condemn the area in the floodplain.

The Minnesota Department of Transportation studied using the portion of Shepard/Warner Road between Chestnut Street (now Eagle Parkway) and the current Lafayette Bridge as an alternative freeway routing around Downtown Saint Paul. The loop would have then followed Eagle Parkway and Kellogg Boulevard up Cathedral Hill to where it meets I-94, then up Marion Street and the Arch-Pennsylvania freeway to I-35E, then south along I-94 until it meets the Lafayette Bridge. The plan was shelved due to cost considerations.

It was flooded by the Mississippi in the floods of 1965, of 1993, and 1997. Shepard and Warner roads were built in the riverbed to help businesses grow in the floodplain. The roads also helped in the development of the riverfront.

== Importance ==
When constructed in the 1960s, the road was the only four-lane, restricted-access connection between the I-494 beltline and downtown Saint Paul, as I-35E had not yet been completed. The road remains an important route for trucks to bypass weight restrictions on Interstate 35E and slower traffic and signal lights on Highway 5. The road closely parallels Minnesota State Highway 5 for most of its length in St. Paul and takes traffic off of Highway 5 to bypass the middle of downtown St. Paul. The road is heavily used in St. Paul for traffic coming to and from the Minneapolis-Saint Paul International Airport served by Highway 5. Because of its importance, it has been looked at by the Commissioner of Transportation to be marked as a state route, but the road is not likely to become a marked route in the near future.

Because of the location's proximity to railroads, The Webb Company was at one time on Shepard Road. Founded in 1882, Webb Publishing was among the largest printing companies in the United States, and printed magazines including The Farmer, books and telephone directories on Shepard Road. Webb was acquired by other companies, most famously by the British Printing & Communications Corp. (BPCC) of Robert Maxwell.

The first assembly of the Territorial Legislature of the Minnesota Territory was held on June 1, 1849, in a hotel that was on Shepard Road.

== Major intersections ==
County	Location	mi	km	Destinations	Notes
Ramsey	St. Paul			MN 5 (West 7th Street)	
Ramsey	St. Paul			I-35E / Great River Road (National Route)	Western end of Great River Road overlap
Ramsey	St. Paul			CSAH 38 west (Randolph Avenue)	
Ramsey	St. Paul			Childs Road	Interchange
Ramsey	St. Paul			US 10 / US 61 / Great River Road (National Route)	Eastern end of Great River Road overlap
1.000 mi = 1.609 km; 1.000 km = 0.621 mi: Concurrency terminus
