= Ayd Mill Road =

Road in St. Paul, Minnesota

Coordinates: 44°56′24″N 93°9′8″W

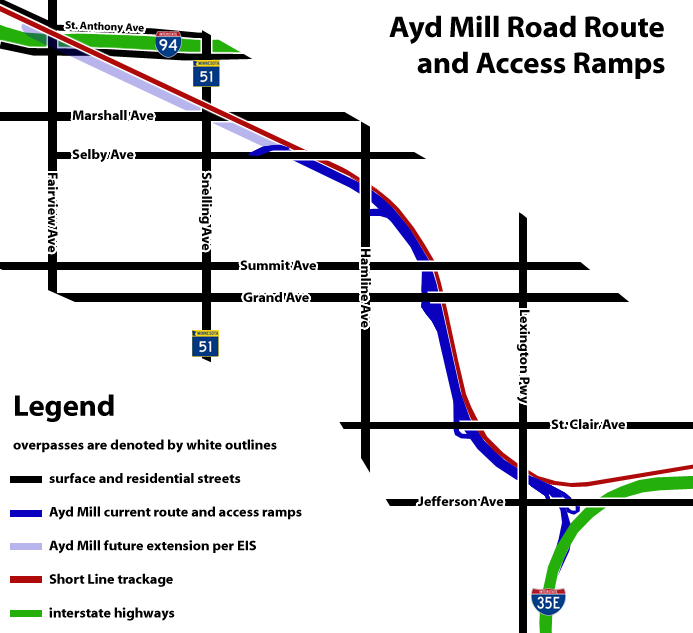
A map of the current layout of Ayd Mill Road in Saint Paul, Minnesota

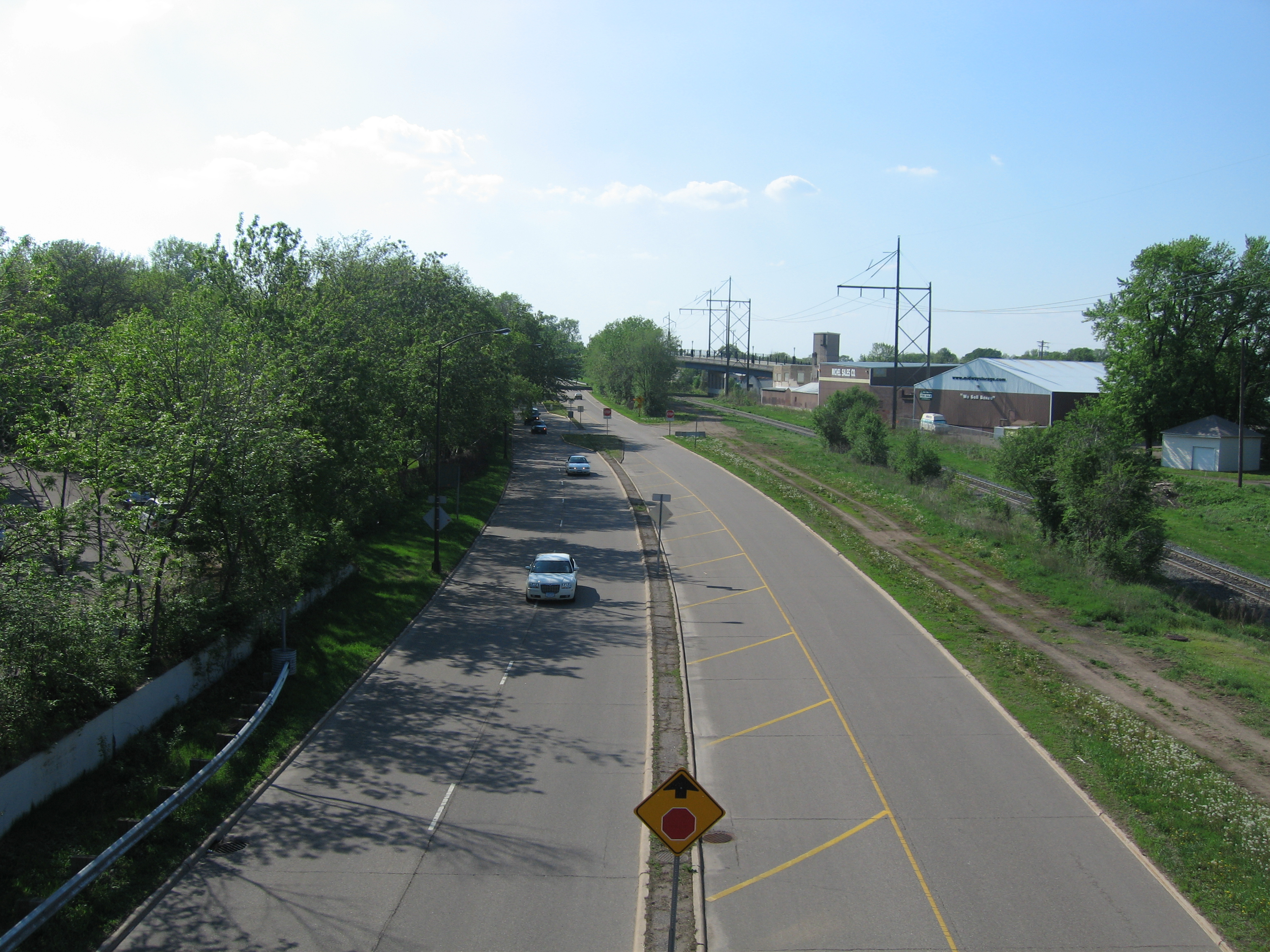
Looking northwest on Ayd Mill Road, from Hamline Avenue overpass

Ayd Mill Road (/ˌaɪd ˈmɪl/ EYED MILL) is a road in Saint Paul, Minnesota. It runs diagonally through Saint Paul, connecting with Interstate 35E at its southeast terminus, and feeds into Selby Avenue at its northwest end. Indirect access to I-94 is possible via Selby and Snelling Avenues. Originally known as the Short Line Road, it was renamed in 1987 for John Ayd, a German settler who maintained a mill and residence in the area in the mid-to-late 19th century.

== History ==
The foundation of the roadway dates back to the 1870s when the Chicago, Milwaukee, St. Paul and Pacific Railroad acquired the right-of-way of the stream bed to lay down tracks. The "Short Line," as it was called, was one of the main interurban routes that served Saint Paul and its railroad suburbs on its way to Minneapolis at the turn of the 20th century. With the advent of the TCRT streetcar system in the 1910s, the line was redundant and was converted to heavy rail by the CMSPP, though it still carried passenger trains between the Saint Paul Union Depot and the Milwaukee Road Depot in neighboring Minneapolis.

In the 1960s, the city of Saint Paul began construction on the Short Line Road, envisioning a below-grade, limited access direct link between I-35E and I-94. However, local opposition in the Merriam Park neighborhood, coupled with the stunted construction of I-35E due to opposition from the Summit Hill neighborhood, kept the vision from being a reality. A connection was made at grade with Selby Avenue, but the connection with I-35E was not made at this time, forcing southbound travelers to exit on Jefferson Avenue when the road first opened in 1965.

=== Connection with I-35E ===
For most of its life, Ayd Mill Road was un-striped, and very little traffic was seen on it. In the summer of 1992, the Saint Paul public works department temporarily linked Ayd Mill Road to I-35E to help mitigate traffic congestion during the completion of the interstate in the downtown area, after which the link was barricaded.

In the late 1990s the city again revisited the prospect of the I-35E-to-I-94 connection as part of an environmental study as one of many options for the public right-of-way. Other options included replacing the entire stretch of road with a park. In the end, the city decided the best option was a rebuilt roadway that extended north along the railroad to St. Anthony Avenue, where a connection to I-94 was possible. Though renewed neighborhood protest has blocked this measure, the road has been blacktopped and striped, and the I-35E ramps were reopened after signals were put on Ayd Mill's entrance ramps.

While in the middle of the Environmental Impact Statement, Mayor Randy Kelly opened the Ayd Mill to I-35E ramps as a temporary test in 2002, and those ramps have remained open ever since. The Saint Paul City Council twice passed resolutions in support of reducing lanes to a two-lane parkway (once in 2000, and again in 2009).

In April 2024 MnDOT misspelled the I-35E exit for Ayd Mill Road accidentally installing a sign that read "Ady Mill Road".

== Current status ==
The adjacent track is still used today by Canadian Pacific and Amtrak's Empire Builder runs on these rails.

In 2019 the Saint Paul City Council approved mill and overlaying the road in its current configuration for $3.5 million. Mayor Melvin Carter requested turning two lanes into a greenway but that plan would have cost $9.8 million due to drainage problems. The corridor is built on a buried stream which causes drainage and pavement preservation challenges.

The council ultimately approved a $7.5 million construction project that reduced lanes from four to three and added a protected bicycle and pedestrian trail.
