= Lafayette Bridge =

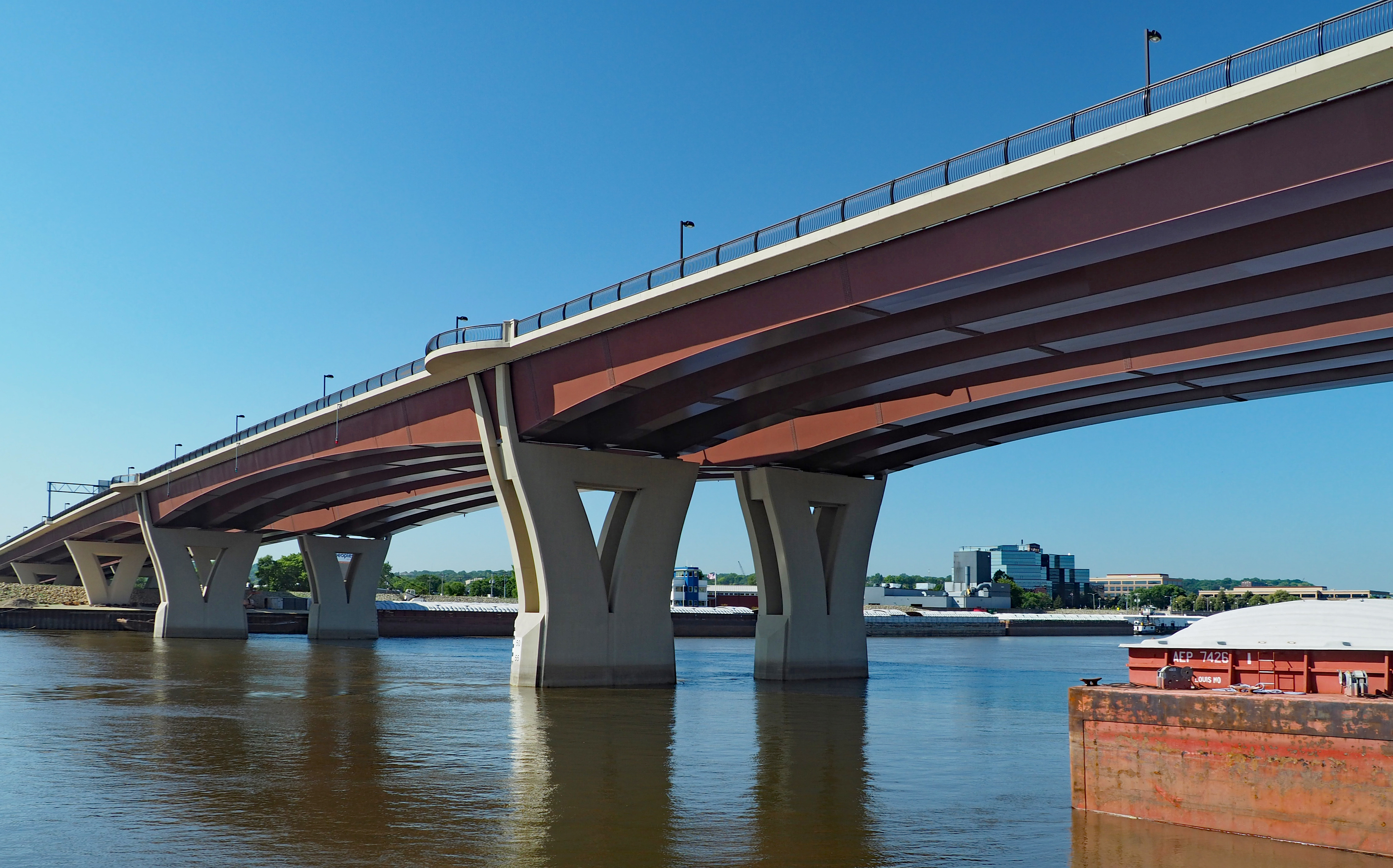
- The rebuilt Lafayette Bridge, completed in 2015
- Coordinates: 44°56′48″N 93°04′45″W
- Carries: Six lanes of US 52
- Crosses: Mississippi River
- Locale: St. Paul, Minnesota
- Official name: Lafayette Street Bridge
- Maintained by: Minnesota Department of Transportation
- ID number: 9800

Characteristics
- Design: Mainspans: Steel Tub Girder / Approach Spans: Prestressed concrete
- Total length: 3375 feet
- Width: 67 feet
- Longest span: 362 feet
- Clearance below: 51 feet

History
- Opened: 2015

The Lafayette Bridge is a bridge carrying U.S. Route 52 across the Mississippi River in downtown Saint Paul, Minnesota. At this point, US 52 is on the Lafayette Freeway. The bridge spans across railroad yards north of the Mississippi, the river itself, and industrial areas south of the Mississippi. The Lafayette Bridge is one of the longest Mississippi River bridges in the Twin Cities.

An earlier bridge on Lafayette Street, built in 1905 by C.A.P. Turner, was removed to make room for the Lafayette Bridge. The 1905 bridge spanned the Soo Line Railroad tracks, not the river itself. This was an experimental bridge of Turner's design, being a flat slab resting on mushroom-capped columns for support. A replacement Lafayette Bridge was constructed during the 1960s and opened to traffic in 1968.

In the aftermath of the collapse of the I-35W Mississippi bridge in Minneapolis, the old Lafayette Bridge (Pre-2015) was cited as another bridge in Minnesota with insufficient redundancy—a so-called "fracture critical" structure which could collapse with the failure of just a single support element. The old Lafayette bridge underwent in-depth annual bridge inspections using special procedures for inspecting fracture critical bridges. A consultant inspection in 2007 reported the overall condition of the structure as fair, with only minor repairs and spot painting recommended. This work was done in 2008. The annual Mn/DOT inspections also report the overall condition of the bridge as fair, and that the bridge was satisfactory for public use. The most recent inspection of the old bridge was carried out in September 2010 and found no significant problems. The bridge nearly collapsed in 1975 after a large crack in a main beam caused a 7-inch (180 mm) dip to form at the road surface. It was temporarily closed to traffic as that damage was repaired. The Lafayette Bridge was already scheduled to be replaced in 2011 before the I-35W bridge collapse occurred in 2007. That event did not impact the replacement schedule, which began in January 2011. It was completed in 2015. The two new bridges (northbound and southbound) each provide two through-lanes and an auxiliary lane in each direction for entering and exiting traffic. The project also included replacement of the Hwy 52 bridges over I-94 and redecking of the Hwy 52 bridges spanning Plato Boulevard south of the Mississippi River. A pedestrian and bicycle crossing over the river was included in the plans. The project limits stretched along Hwy 52 from East Seventh Street to just south of Plato Boulevard. Lunda Construction Company of Black River Falls, Wisc. was the prime contractor for the $130.4 million project. While the old Lafayette Bridge was a safe structure to use, it was nearing the end of its designed life. The old Lafayette Bridge is not in use any more, the last day it was open was March 1, 2014. The bridge’s age and condition were driving the planned replacement.

== See also ==
- List of crossings of the Upper Mississippi River
