= Minnesota State Highway 110 =

State highway in Minnesota, United States

Trunk Highway 110
- MN 110 highlighted in red

Route information
- Maintained by MnDOT
- Length: 5.245 mi (8.441 km)
- Existed: 1965–2018

Major junctions
- West end: MN 55 in Mendota Heights
- MN 13 in Mendota Heights; I-35E in Mendota Heights; MN 149 in Mendota Heights; MN 3 in Inver Grove Heights
- East end: I-494 / US 52 in Inver Grove Heights

Location
- Country: United States
- State: Minnesota
- Counties: Dakota

Highway system
- Minnesota Trunk Highway System; Interstate; US; State; Legislative; Scenic
← MN 109	→ MN 111

Minnesota State Highway 110 (MN 110) was a short 5 1/4-mile-long (8.4 km) connector state highway in Minnesota, which ran from an interchange with MN 55 in Mendota Heights to an interchange with Interstate 494 (I-494) in Inver Grove Heights, south of downtown Saint Paul.

On October 23, 2017, the Minnesota Department of Transportation (MnDOT) announced that MN 110 would be renamed as an extension of MN 62. MnDOT said the change was necessary to prevent confusion to visitors and residents. MN 62 signs went up in August 2018, while MN 110 signs were labelled "Old Highway 110" for one year after the switch.

== Route description ==
MN 110 served as an east–west arterial highway between Mendota Heights, Mendota, West St. Paul, Sunfish Lake, and Inver Grove Heights. The highway was a four-lane divided highway with a total of seven stoplights for eastbound traffic and six westbound.

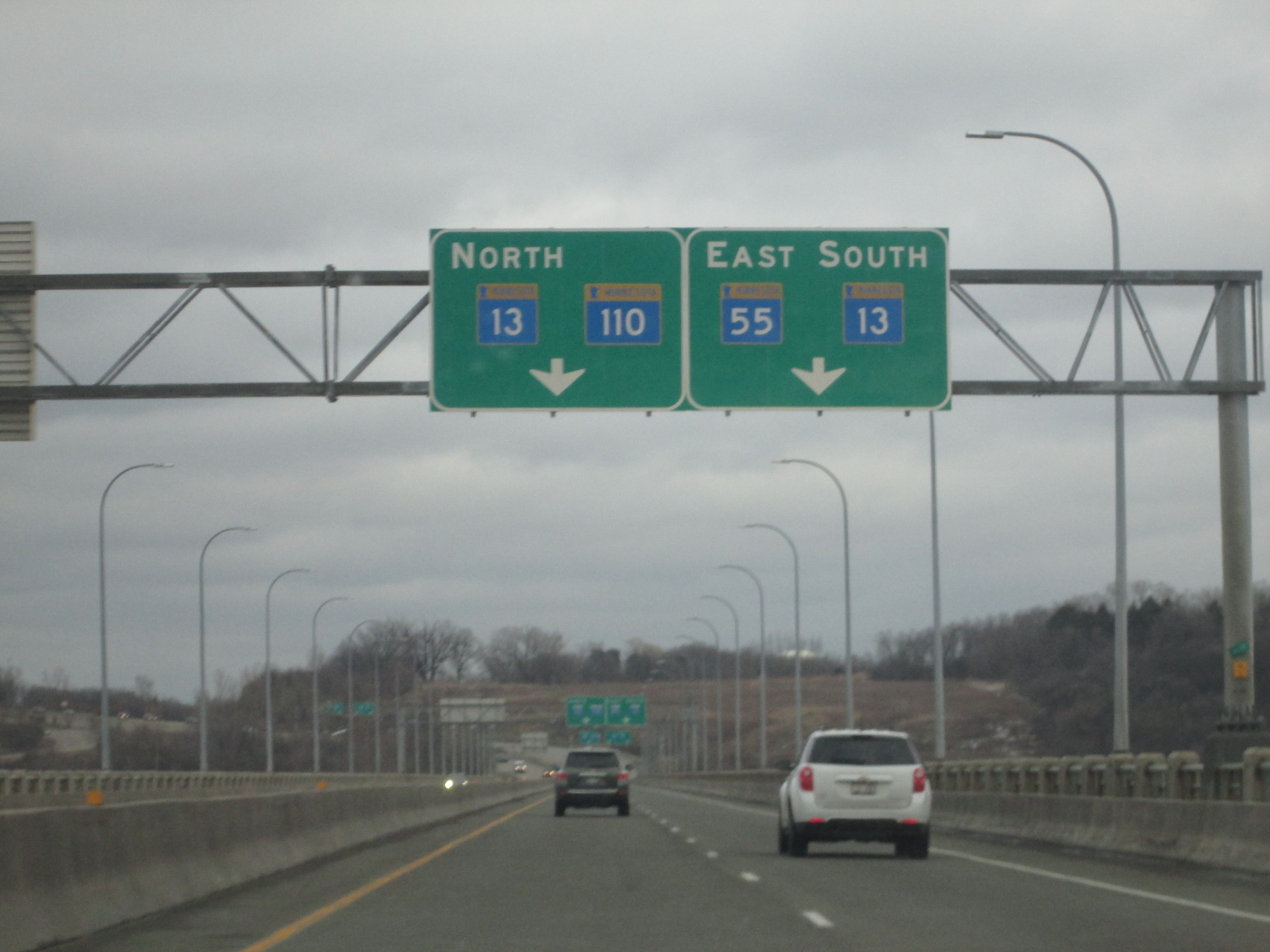
MN 55 crossing the Minnesota River with its western terminus across the river

The highway had a major junction with I-35E in the center of Mendota Heights. The highway also had an interchange with Robert Street/Robert Trail (MN 3) in Inver Grove Heights. MN 110 paralleled I-494 throughout its route in Dakota County. It also had an interchange with I-494 at its eastern terminus in Inver Grove Heights. The western terminus of MN 110 was located near the confluence of the Minnesota and Mississippi rivers at the Mendota Bridge.

== History ==
MN 110 was marked in 1965 and replaced the same route previously known as part of MN 100 from 1934 to 1965. This route was originally part of the MN 100 Beltway circling the entire Twin Cities during the 1940s and 1950s. It was paved before 1940 and constructed as a divided highway by 1953.

Before completion of the I-494 freeway in 1985, I-494 had a missing link for 20 years. MN 110 had carried all I-494 traffic from its beginning at MN 55 in Mendota Heights, to the then-completed portion of I-494 at Babcock Trail in Inver Grove Heights. There was a traffic signal at this junction (where 3, MN 52, MN 110, and I-494 all intersected) for many years following completion of the nearby Lafayette Freeway (then marked MN 3, now US Highway 52). An interchange has since been constructed replacing this traffic signal.

After a resurfacing construction project in 2017, MnDOT announced that starting in 2018 the department would redesignate MN 110 to MN 62, providing one continuously-named highway that connects two ends of I-494.

== Major intersections ==
The entire route was in Dakota County.

Location	mi	km	Destinations	Notes
Mendota Heights	0.000	0.000	MN 55 west	Westbound exit and eastbound entrance
Mendota Heights	0.387	0.623	MN 13 to MN 55 east	
Mendota Heights	1.496	2.408	I-35E – St. Paul, Albert Lea	I-35E exit 101; interchange
Mendota Heights	2.167	3.487	MN 149 (Dodd Road)	
Inver Grove Heights	4.470	7.194	MN 3 (South Robert Trail)	Interchange
Inver Grove Heights	5.245	8.441	I-494 / US 52 – St. Paul, Rochester	Eastbound exit and westbound entrance; I-494 exit 67
1.000 mi = 1.609 km; 1.000 km = 0.621 mi: Incomplete access
