= Lexington Bridge (Mississippi River) =

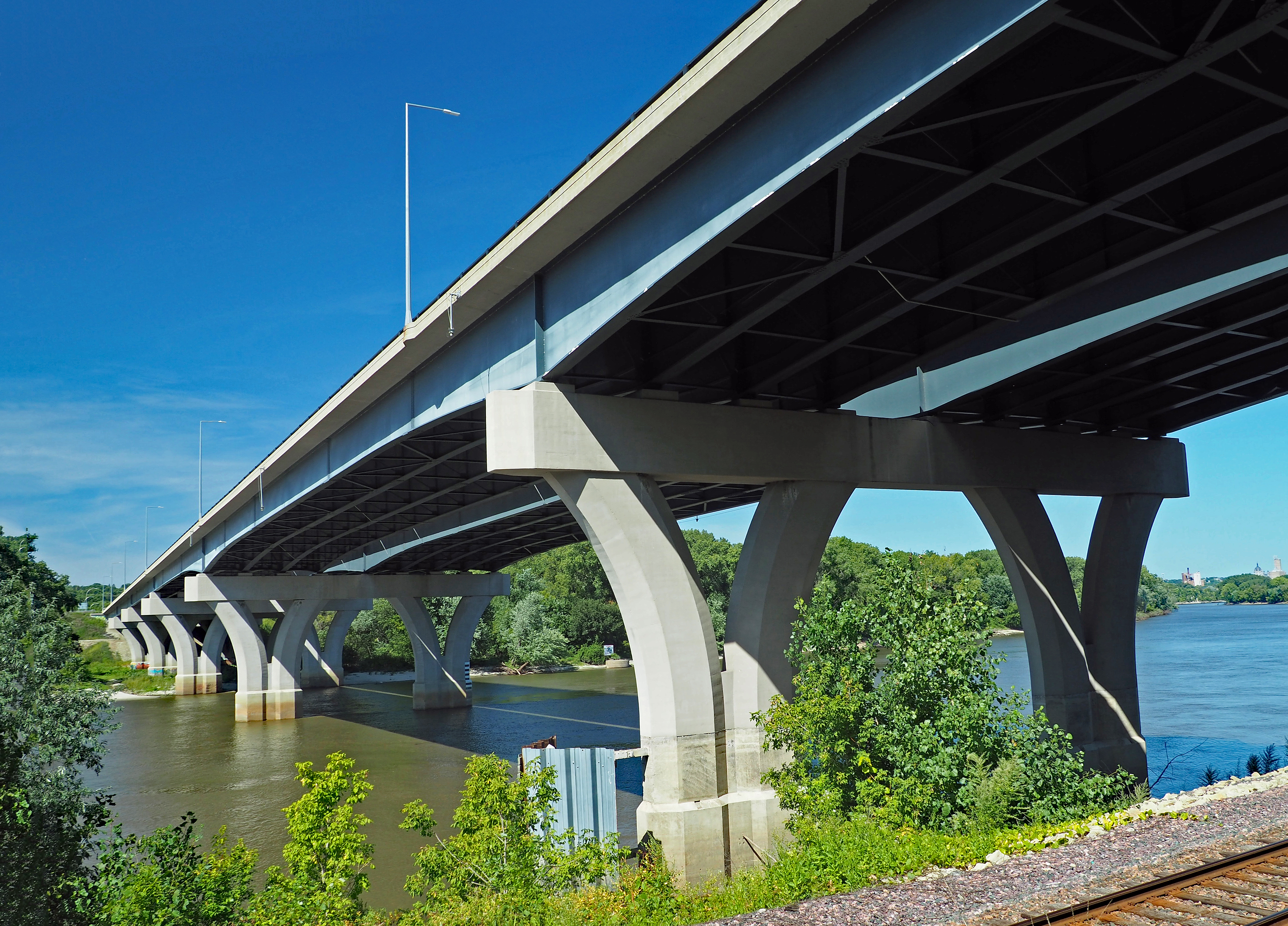
- The Lexington Bridge viewed from the south
- Coordinates: 44°54′16″N 93°08′20″W
- Carries: I-35E
- Crosses: Mississippi River
- Locale: St. Paul, Minnesota
- Maintained by: Minnesota Department of Transportation
- ID number: 62912

Characteristics
- Design: Plate girder bridge
- Total length: 1406 feet (428.6 m)
- Width: 110 feet (33.6 m)
- Clearance below: 61 feet (18.5 m)

History
- Opened: 2004

Statistics
- Daily traffic: 81000

Lexington Bridge is a plate girder bridge that spans the Mississippi River between Saint Paul and Lilydale, Minnesota, United States. It was built in 2004 by the Minnesota Department of Transportation.

The original Lexington Bridge was built in 1965 as part of the proposed construction of Interstate 35E. However, the bridge did not see much use for a while, because I-35E was not completed between Lilydale and Burnsville until the mid-1980s. Construction of I-35E between Minnesota State Highway 5, just north of the bridge, and Interstate 94 in downtown St. Paul was not finished until the early 1990s. The increase in traffic caused the old bridge to deteriorate faster than expected. As a result of deterioration, and a need to carry more traffic, the old bridge was replaced. The staging of this construction project was notable for keeping four lanes of traffic open during the process. A new span was built on the west side of the bridge, and then traffic was detoured to the new southbound span and the old southbound span. The old northbound span was demolished, and a new northbound span was built. When this was completed, the old southbound span was demolished, and the inner two lanes of the new bridge were completed.

The bridge has an anti-icing system that sprays potassium acetate onto the bridge surface to prevent frost and ice formation in inclement weather. This is part of a test to see if measured application of chemicals can prolong the life of a structure, as compared to the usual liberal application of sodium chloride salt.

== See also ==
- List of crossings of the Upper Mississippi River
