= Neighborhoods in Saint Paul, Minnesota =

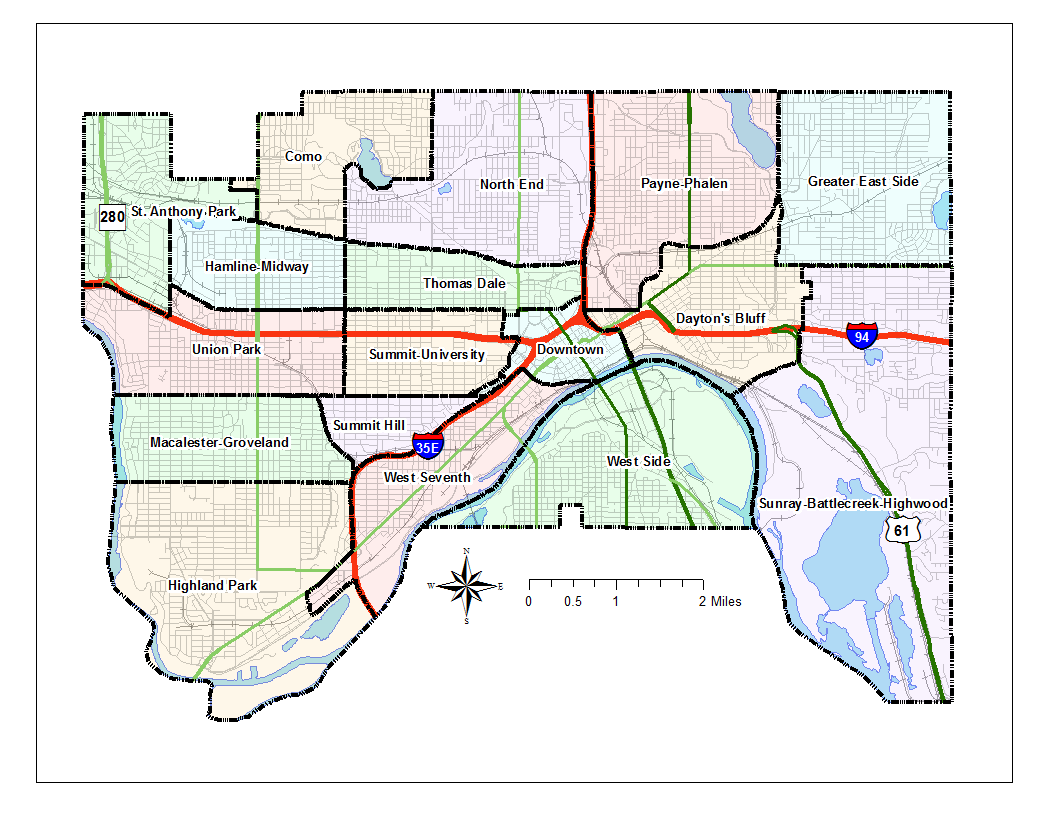
A map of the officially defined neighborhoods of Saint Paul, Minnesota.

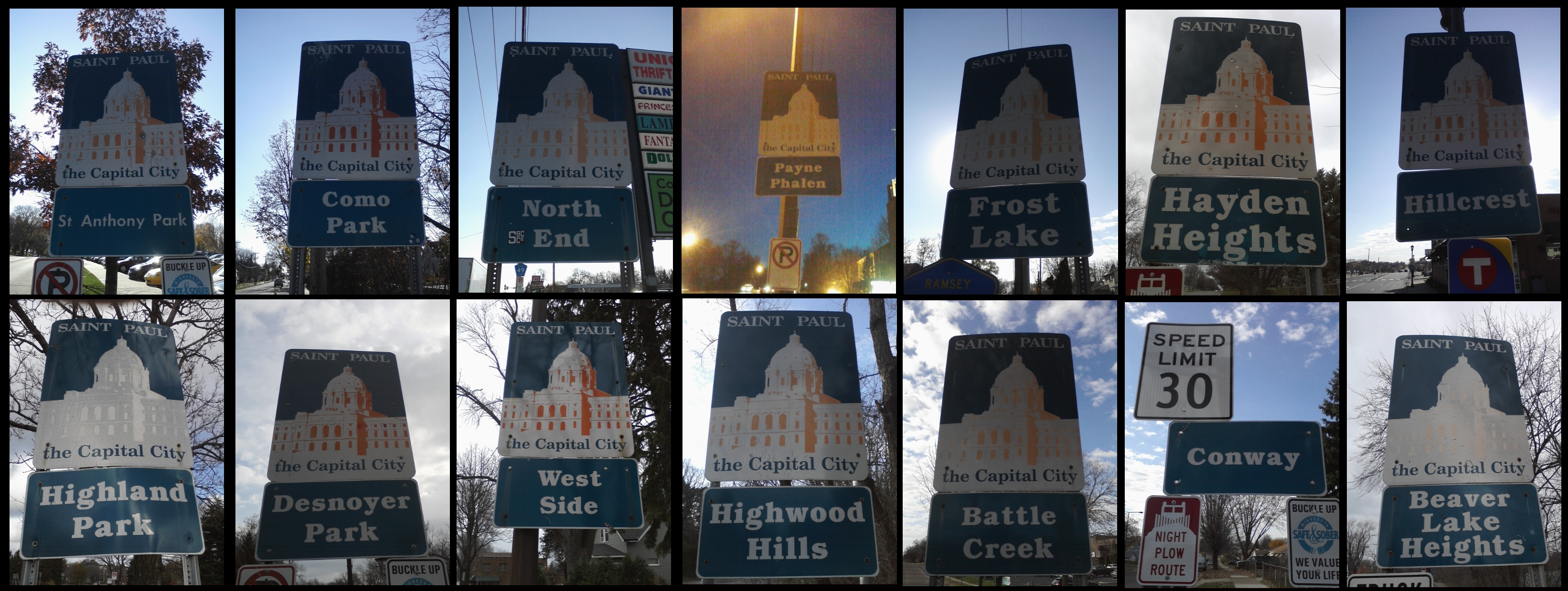
Saint Paul neighborhood markers.

Saint Paul, Minnesota, consists of 17 officially defined city districts or neighborhoods.

In its history, the city has been called "fifteen small towns with one mayor", owing to the neighborhood-based life of much of the city, though the city is partially governed by not 15 but 17 City Districts.

On Saint Paul's largely blue-collar East Side alone there are more than two dozen well-known, historically significant neighborhoods within four City Districts. District 4, for example, has three historic neighborhoods: Dayton's Bluff, Swede Hollow, and Mounds Park. The most populous districts, 2 and 5, have more than a dozen neighborhoods between them.

While Saint Paul has long been recognized for its citizen activism, some neighborhoods receive more individual planning attention than others, because tax funds are doled out to annually elected volunteer neighborhood boards based on City District boundaries, not neighborhood boundaries. These boards are called District Councils.

The District Council system was established in 1975 to encourage grassroots involvement. The Councils were also created to help spend federal funds through the recently created Community Development Block Grants. The District Councils share $1.2 million from the city of Saint Paul. In 2015, community participation funds given to the District Councils ranged from $51,873 to $109,475. The councils also have other revenue streams, such as grants and donations. Most councils have significant power on land-use issues.

Besides providing advisory recommendations to city officials on development issues, district councils also identify neighborhood needs, initiate community programs and recruit and nurture neighborhood leaders and volunteers.

Many of St. Paul's neighborhoods began as rail-line commuter suburbs, including Merriam Park, St. Anthony Park, Macalester Park, Desnoyer Park, Hazel Park, Union Park, Warrendale, and Burlington Heights. Burlington Heights was south of downtown along the Burlington's tracks to Hastings. The Heights had two train stations a mile apart. The Highwood station was close to where Highwood Avenue ran into the rail line. The remnants of that early 1880s development are discernible. The neighborhood boundaries were Lower Afton Road, Burlington Road, Ogdan Avenue and the Burlington train track.

== District Councils ==
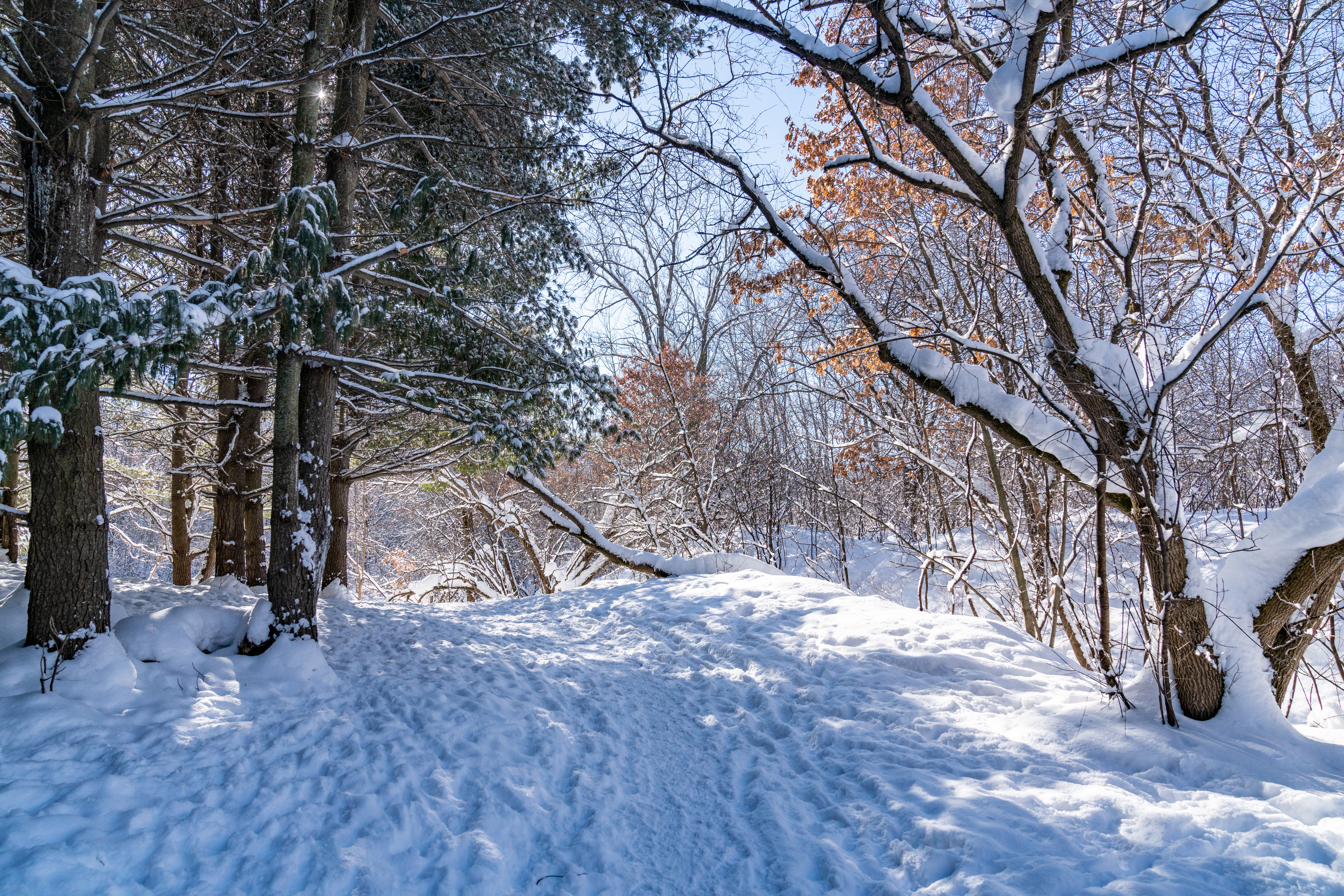
Battle Creek Regional park

=== District 1 - Eastview, Conway, Battle Creek, Highwood Hills ===
These four neighborhoods make up the Southeast Side, in the southeast corner of Saint Paul. They are predominantly residential communities that vary widely economically, geographically, and culturally. It is the site of both single-family homes on large lots and high density apartment complexes. Parks overlook the Mississippi River and Pig's Eye Lake, and nestle into 1960s-era neighborhoods. The area's riverfront is part of Saint Paul's working river.

=== District 2 - Greater East Side ===
The Greater East Side is among the city's largest, most populous and most diverse districts. It is in St. Paul's northeast corner. Boundaries are the city limits on the north and east; Minnehaha Avenue to the south; and Johnson Parkway to the west. It includes the neighborhoods of Frost Lake, Hillcrest, Prosperity Heights, Hayden Heights, Beaver Lake, Hazel Park, and Phalen Village. Built as bedroom communities for the industries further south on the East Side (3M, Whirlpool, Hamm’s), the neighborhoods continue to include commuter homes with retail and service industries on White Bear Avenue and in Phalen Village.

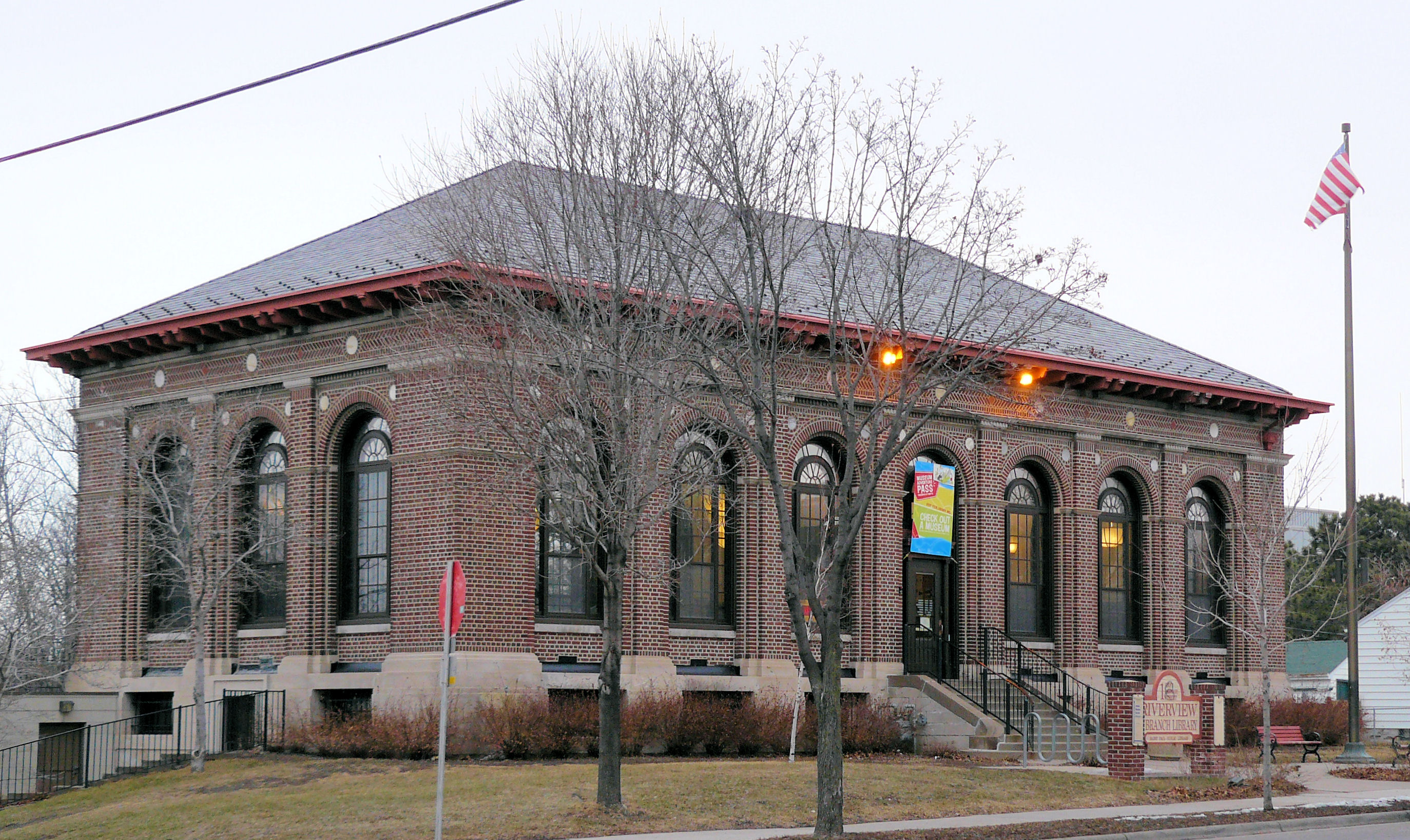
Riverview Library

=== District 3 - West Side ===
The West Side is actually to the south and across the Mississippi River from Downtown Saint Paul. It is called the West Side because it is on the west bank of the predominantly north-south river. It is adjacent to the suburban cities of South St. Paul and West St. Paul. The West Side is home to one of the largest Hispanic communities in the Twin Cities, centered along César Chávez Street.

=== District 4 - Dayton's Bluff ===
Dayton's Bluff is on the east side of the Mississippi in southeastern Saint Paul. It has a residential district on an elevated plateau bounded by the ridges of the Mississippi River Valley. The name commemorates Lyman Dayton (1810–1865), for whom a city and a township in Hennepin County also were named. The area of the neighborhood that had views of the river valley and Downtown Saint Paul was purchased as early as the 1850s, with most of the houses being built in the 1880s. On the edge of the southern and highest part of Dayton's Bluff along the Mississippi River is the Indian Mounds Park. Within the park are six remaining burial mounds from the prehistoric era of the Hopewell mound builders. Dayton's Bluff has undergone much renovation and restoration in recent years.

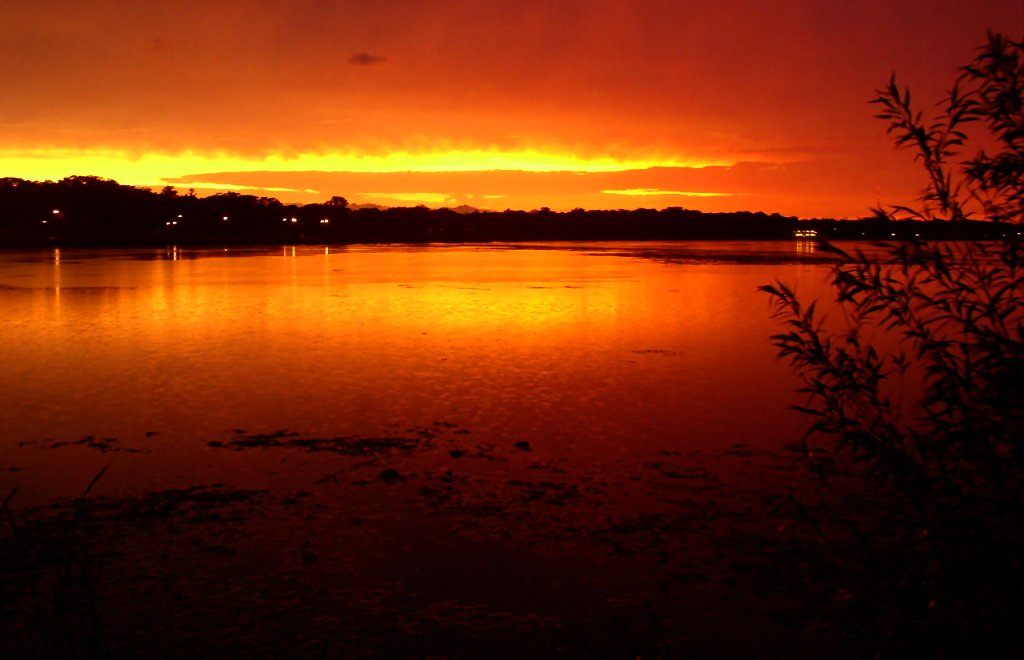
Sunset over Lake Phalen

=== District 5 - Payne-Phalen ===
The Payne-Phalen city district includes the Railroad Island, Phalen Park, Rivoli Bluff, Vento, Wheelock Park, and Williams Hill neighborhoods, and ranges from a blue-collar area to the south to a middle-class area north of Maryland Avenue, including upscale real estate around Lake Phalen. The neighborhood was originally a 160-acre tract jointly purchased by William Sprigg Hall, Harwood Iglehart, and Charles Mackubin, Southern slaveowners who named the neighborhood's streets after the flowers of their homeland, including Hawthorn, Hyacinth, and Magnolia.

Payne-Phalen also contains community services.

=== District 6 - North End ===
One of Saint Paul’s largest residential areas, the North End houses a number of businesses, schools, churches and parks. The neighborhood was developed in the 1870s and 1880s south of Maryland Avenue, where Victorian-era homes were built on narrow lots. The neighborhood's northern half was developed in the 1920s or later; the area along Wheelock Parkway was developed in the 1950s. The main commercial corridor is Rice Street (named after the famous Minnesota politician Henry M. Rice), which became a commercial corridor in the late 1890s with the arrival of streetcars.

The North End is home to Marydale Park, Lewis Park, Sylvan Park, Lyton Park and the Front Avenue Skate Park. The North End houses numerous schools. Some of the state’s more prominent politicians, such as Henry Sibley, William Marshall and Alexander Ramsey, are laid to rest at Oakland Cemetery. The North End also marks the start of the Gateway Trail, and the Trout Brook Nature Sanctuary and Reserve is found at its eastern border. The Willow Reserve, a bird sanctuary, is a 5.5-acre wetland and home to many species of birds. The North End is rich in history and traditions dating back to the 1800s as well as embracing customs from newer arrivals, being home to the largest population of Karen and Karenni immigrants from Burma.

=== District 7 - Frogtown (Thomas-Dale) ===
Frogtown/Thomas Dale is built around University Avenue. Thomas-Dale is colloquially known as Frogtown. Historically, Frogtown was a section of the current Thomas-Dale neighborhood bordered by University Avenue on the south, Van Buren Avenue on the north, Dale Street on the west and Western Avenue on the east.

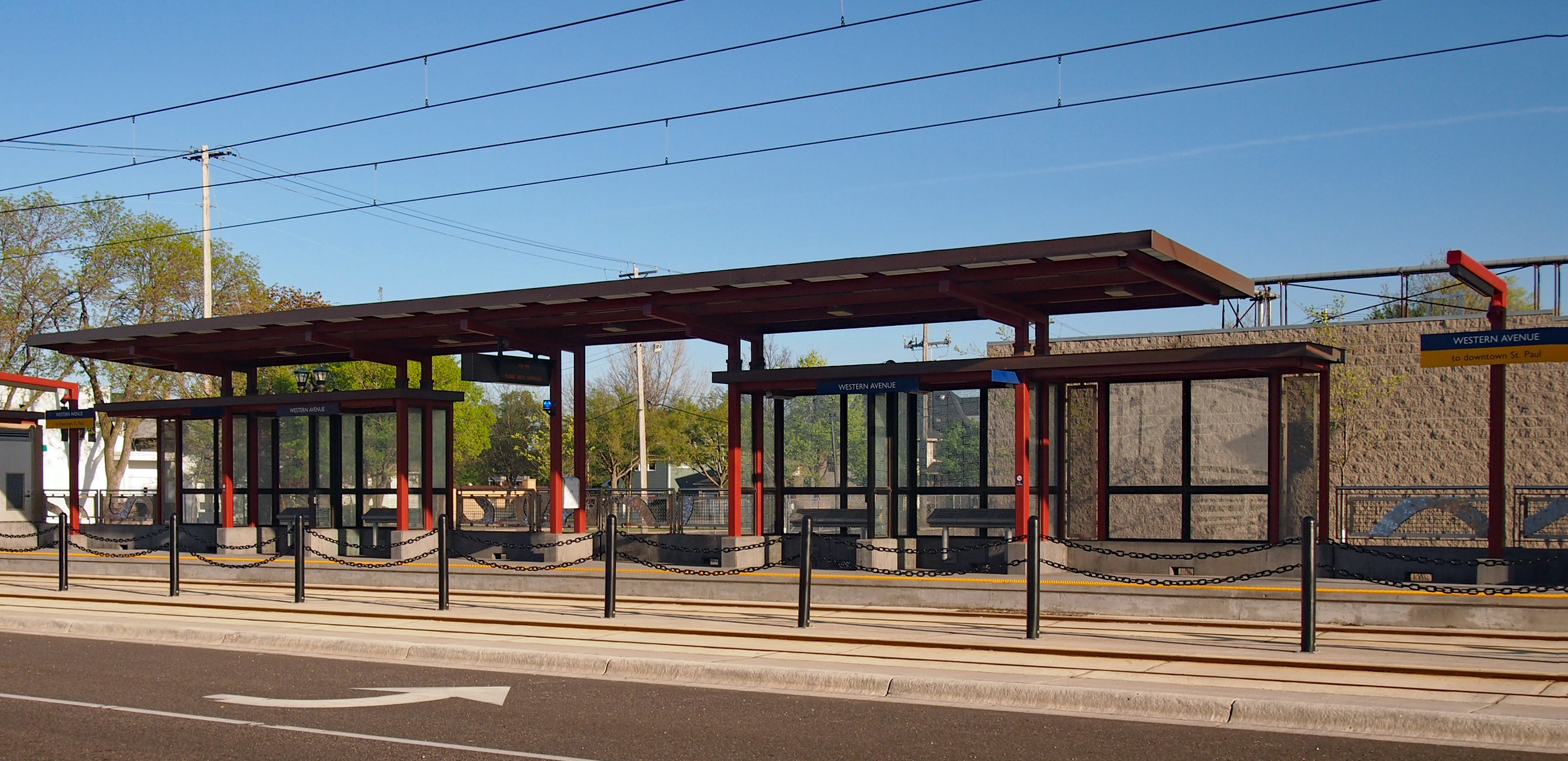
Western Ave Station

=== District 8 - Summit-University ===
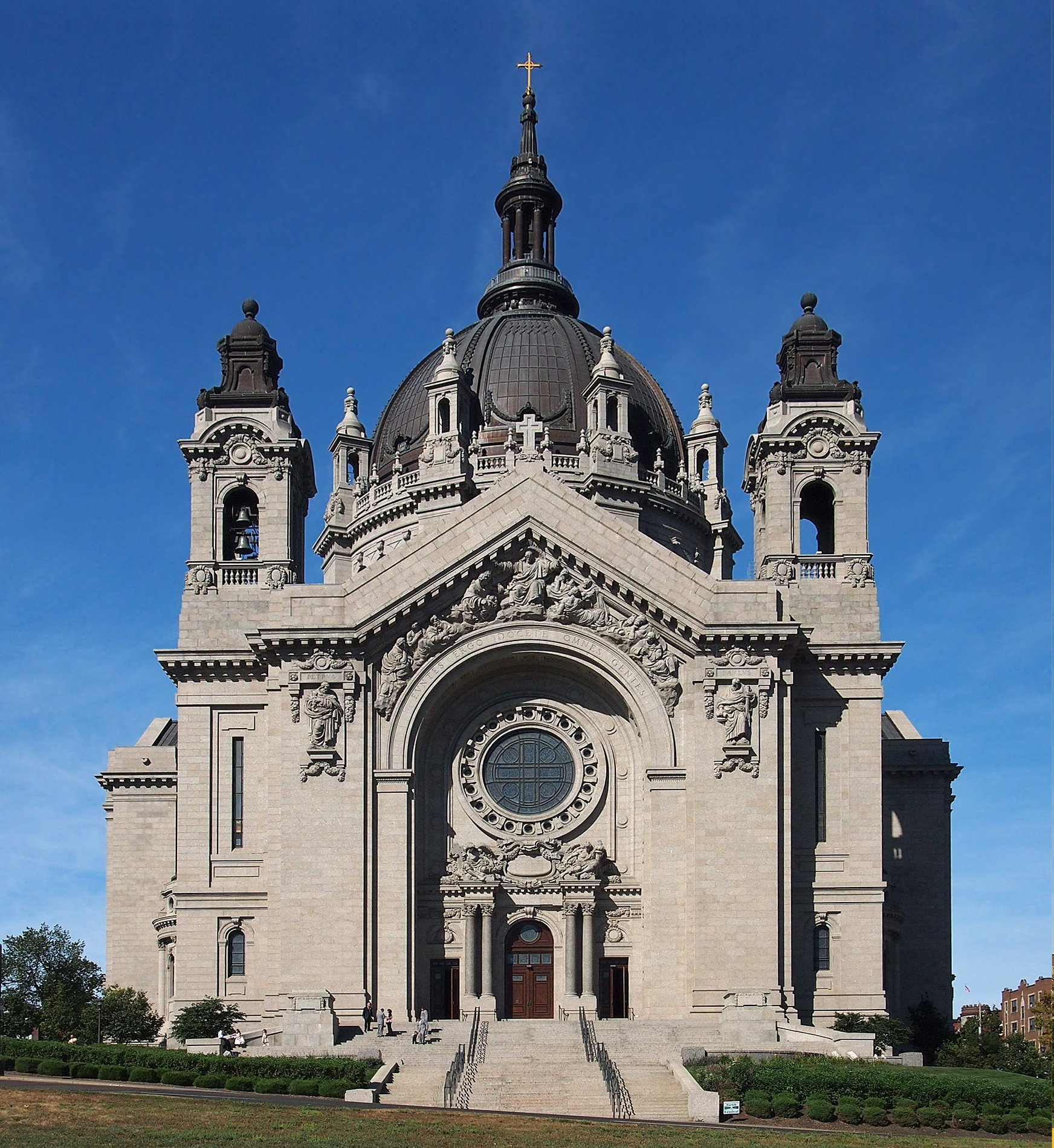
Saint Paul cathedral

Summit-University is an ethnically and economically diverse community west of Downtown Saint Paul. It includes the historic Cathedral Hill neighborhood, as well as what remains of "old Rondo", a former neighborhood of the city. Among the many groups living in Summit-University are the Hmong community as well as the city's other Asian communities, including large numbers of Vietnamese, Laotians and Cambodians.

In the 1880s, the southern portion closest to Summit Avenue was the preeminent neighborhood to live in. Housing further north and closer to University Avenue was less grand. Parts of the neighborhood experienced significant urban renewal after the 1960s which resulted in the destruction of the Rondo neighborhood to make way for Interstate 94. Sections of the neighborhood north of Interstate 94 were torn down and replaced with developments that more closely resembled the suburbs, leaving a striking contrast with the late 19th- and early 20th-century homes south near Ramsey Hill.

=== District 9 - West Seventh/Fort Road ===
West Seventh in St. Paul is also known as Fort Road, owing to its location on historic Native American and fur trader paths along the northern bank of the Mississippi River from downtown Saint Paul to Fort Snelling. This area is colloquially known as the "West End", and is different from the area across the river known as the "West Side". The West Seventh neighborhood was originally a series of European immigrant neighborhoods along the western bluffs of the Mississippi River, spanning the entire length of West Seventh St. or "Old Fort Rd." During the 1880s large populations of Irish, German, Czech, Slovak and (to a lesser degree) Scandinavian immigrants moved to the West End.

"Saint Paul has a rich history of active and distinct neighborhoods. To support neighborhood participation in governance, the district council planning process was created over 30 years ago." There are 17 district councils, and the district council of the West End is the Fort Road Federation/District 9 Community Council. "Responsibilities of the councils include: planning and advising on the physical, economic, and social development of their areas; identifying needs; initiating community programs; recruiting volunteers; and sponsoring community events." The Federation actually predates the District Council system in St. Paul. "...in 1973, a group of about a dozen community members banded together to create the West 7th/Fort Road Federation. They founded the organization on the principle that citizens acting together could maintain and improve the quality of life in their neighborhoods and help commercial endeavors prosper once again. With a $5,000 start-up grant from the Christian Sharing Fund, the young organization headed down a path of community development and support that would continue for many years to come."

Today, several organizations and task forces serve the neighborhoods that make up the West End. Task forces of the Federation include West End Gardeners as well as the North High Bridge Park Task Forces; the West Seventh Business Association and its Enhancement coalition; the Irvine Park Historic District and Association; Czech and Slovak Sokol Minnesota in its historic hall on the national historic register; and the West 7th Community Center.

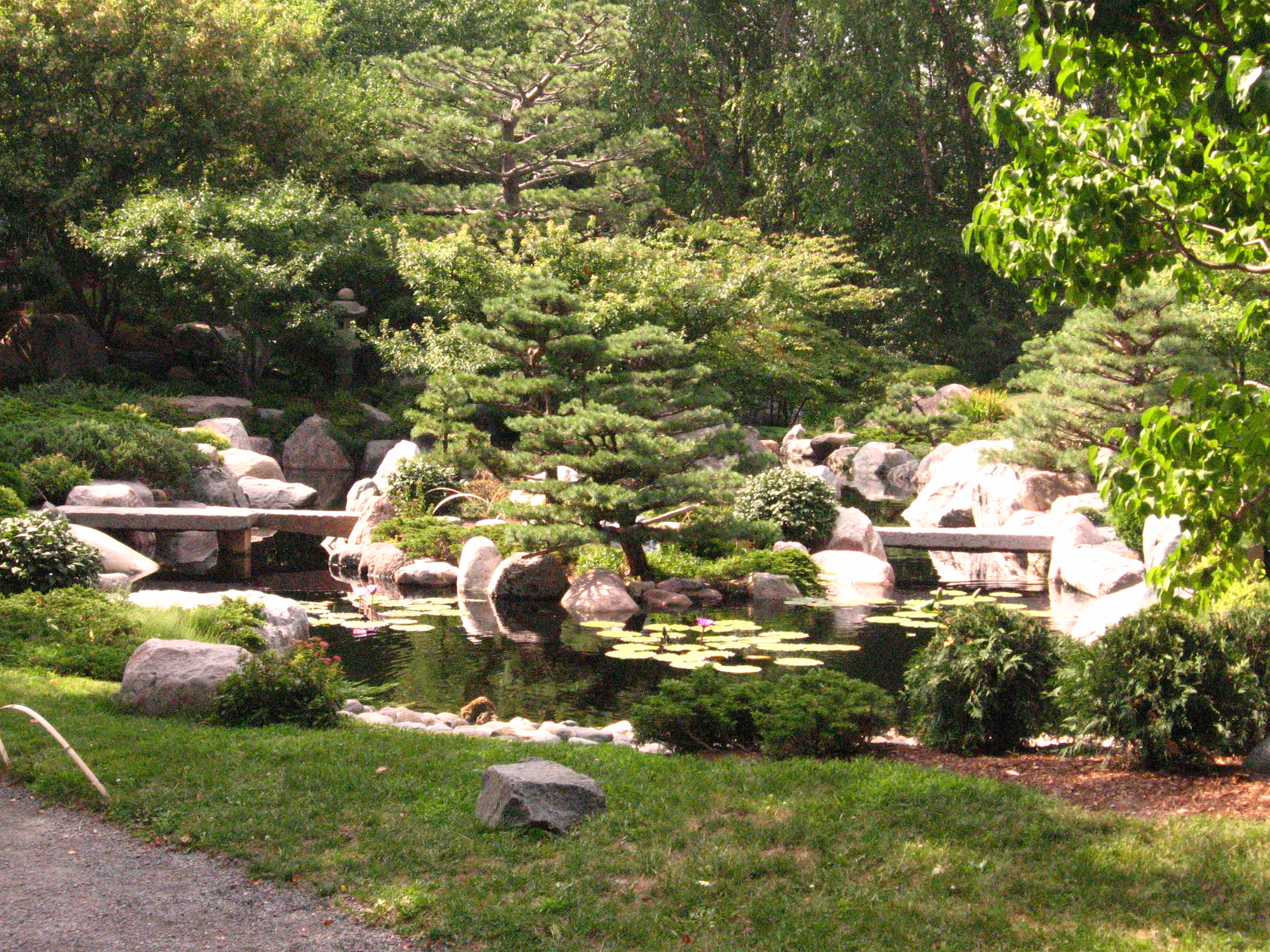
Como Conservatory Japanese Garden entrance

=== District 10 - Como Park ===
Como Park is a neighborhood situated around Como Lake. The Como Park neighborhood has many recreational facilities, including a golf course, bike path, various open fields, a pavilion, a municipal pool, and the Como Zoo, one of two zoos in the Twin Cities (the other being the Minnesota Zoo). The Como area is also home to many of the city's ginkgo trees. There are several schools in Como Park, the public schools in the area being Chelsea Heights Elementary School and the Como Park Elementary School, the only school in the city to have its own planetarium. The primary secondary school in Como Park is Como Park Senior High School, one of the highest rated schools in the state according to Newsweek.

=== District 11 - Hamline Midway ===
Hamline-Midway derives its name from being halfway between the downtowns of Minneapolis and Saint Paul. The neighborhood includes Hamline University, Allianz Field, Ax-Man Surplus, and the Turf Club. Famous Midway natives include Peanuts cartoonist Charles M. Schulz and the band Heiruspecs.

=== District 12 - Saint Anthony Park ===
Saint Anthony Park, known to residents as SAP, is adjacent to the University of Minnesota Saint Paul campus, bordering Northeast Minneapolis on the west and the Minnesota State Fairgrounds on the east. It was the home to three Minnesota governors (William Marshall, 1866–70; Andrew McGill, 1887–1889; and Elmer L. Andersen, 1961–63). In the late 1800s the area was laid out as estates for the wealthy of Minneapolis. It is centrally located in the Twin Cities, with a business district that contains independently owned shops and restaurants. A Carnegie Library and St. Anthony Park Elementary School are the neighborhood's focal points. SAP also has two colleges, the St. Paul campus of the University of Minnesota and Luther Seminary, and thus is home to graduate students from across the world. The area's largest park is named for former St. Anthony Park resident Nathaniel P. Langford, who was responsible for the world's first national park, Yellowstone.

=== District 13 - Union Park ===
Union Park, created from the merger between former Merriam Park, Snelling Hamline, and Lexington-Hamline District Councils, is a residential neighborhood featuring a large stock of early 20th-century housing, boutique-dominated commercial strips on Selby, Cretin and Cleveland avenues, and the Mississippi National River and Recreation Area forming the neighborhood's western border. Many Union Park residents still identify their neighborhoods with the original names. Concordia University and part of the University of St. Thomas are in the district.

- Lexington-Hamline: The Lex-Ham neighborhood is bounded by University Avenue, Lexington Parkway, and Summit and Hamline Avenues. The Lexington-Hamline Community Council was established in 1969 as St. Paul's first neighborhood organization. It continues to be the cornerstone for organizing and serving the residents living in this neighborhood, and has representation on the Board.
- Snelling Hamline: Between Snelling and Hamline Avenues and bordered by University and Summit Avenues, the Snelling-Hamline neighborhood maintains a distinct identity. It is home both to the long-standing O’Gara’s Bar and Grill, and the new Vintage development at the corner of Snelling and Selby Avenues. This area includes "Midway Center", one of inner-city Saint Paul's key shopping districts.
- Merriam Park: Constituting a large portion of the Union Park area, Merriam Park lies west of Snelling Avenue and stretches west to the park that bears its name. Merriam Park was actually one of the Twin Cities’ first suburbs, a couple of trolley stops outside of early Saint Paul. Entrepreneur John L. Merriam thought the location would make an ideal suburb for businessmen, professional workers and their families. New streetcar lines were being run through the neighborhood, and by 1880 a railroad line linking the two downtowns ran through the area. Merriam purchased land, built a rail depot in his future neighborhood, and started selling lots to future homeowners.

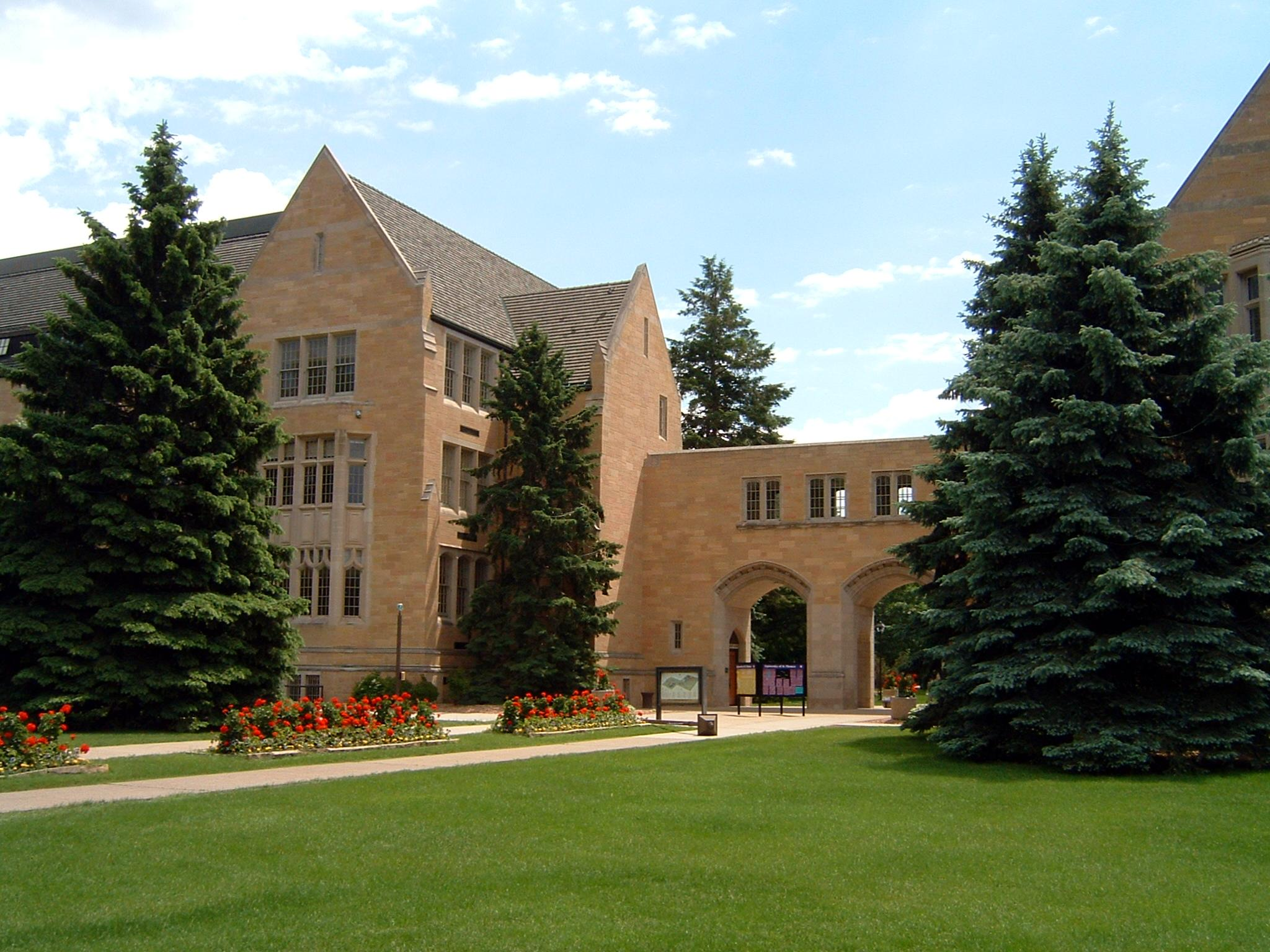
St Thomas campus

=== District 14 - Macalester-Groveland ===
Macalester-Groveland, sometimes called Mac-Groveland, is an established developed neighborhood in western Saint Paul that extends east from the Mississippi River to the Summit Hill neighborhood. The neighborhood is a mix of single-family homes and apartments with corner stores and commercial corridors. The Summit Avenue Historic District, with mansions from the late 1800s, flanks the neighborhood's northern border. In recent years Grand Avenue has developed into a nationally recognized commercial street, with a mixture of national retailers and local vendors. Several colleges and universities, including the University of St. Thomas and Macalester College, are in the neighborhood. The influence of academia and college life is felt throughout the neighborhood, offering residents an array of cultural, athletic, and musical opportunities. Scenic pedestrian and bicycle trails stretch throughout Mac-Groveland, in particular along the Mississippi riverfront.

=== District 15 - Highland Park ===
Highland Park is home to St. Catherine University as well as two private preparatory schools, Cretin-Derham Hall High School and St. Paul Academy and Summit School. For 85 years the neighborhood hosted the Ford Motor Company Twin Cities Assembly Plant, where Ford Ranger and Mazda B-Series pickup trucks were produced. Ford closed the plant in 2011 and the 122 acres of prime real estate along the Mississippi is on track to become a mixed residential and commercial property. In 2018 The Ryan Companies of Minneapolis won the right to develop the property in accordance with a master zoning plan drawn up by the city of St. Paul.

=== District 16 - Summit Hill ===
Summit Hill is bounded by Summit Avenue and Ramsey St. on the north, Interstate 35E on the south and east, and Ayd Mill Road on the west. One of St. Paul's oldest and most popular neighborhoods, Summit Hill is a regional and local treasure of history, architecture, distinctive pedestrian-oriented shopping and dining experiences, and strong community connections. In the 1880s and 1890s the Crocus Hill and Grand Hill neighborhoods, two residential sections of Summit Hill, became fashionable locations for wealthy families. At that time, many earlier Summit Avenue constructions were renovated or razed to make way for more fashionable, or what were thought to be architecturally significant, houses. Early railroad and lumber barons built on Summit Avenue and in the adjacent areas, with families such as the Burbanks and Weyerhaeusers leading local social life.

Summit Avenue was originally conceived as a broad, Gilded Age showcase street, and is lined with mansions named after notable Saint Paul figures, such as railroad tycoon James J. Hill. With its vistas of downtown and the Mississippi River, Summit Avenue is thought to be one of the longest stretches of preserved Victorian mansions in North America. It has been home to artists such as F. Scott Fitzgerald and his wife Zelda, Sinclair Lewis, August Wilson, and Garrison Keillor. More notorious residents have included 1930s-era gangsters such as John Dillinger and members of the Barker-Karpis Gang.

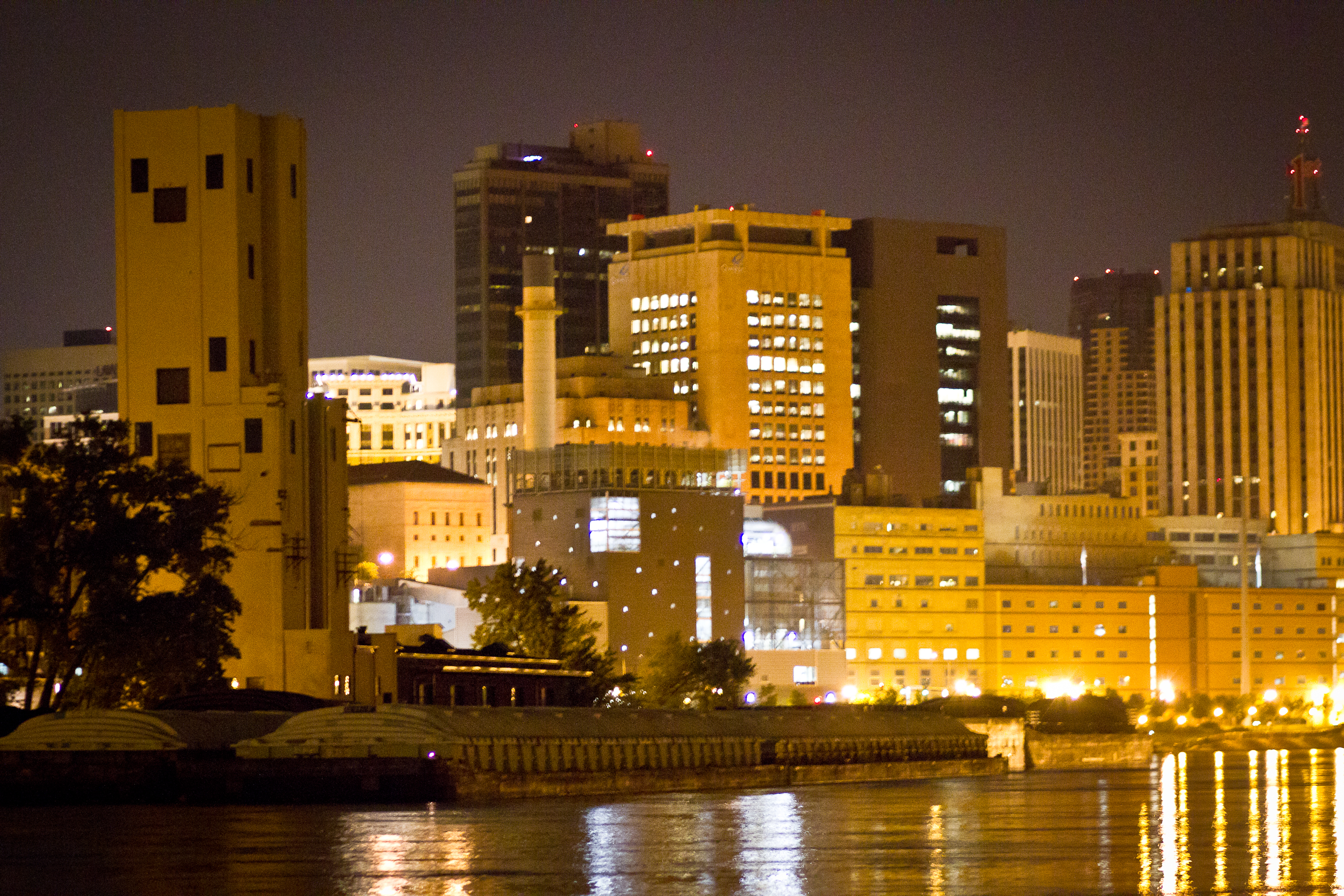
Downtown Saint Paul

=== District 17 - Downtown ===
Downtown Saint Paul is home to Grand Casino Arena (home of the Minnesota Wild), Cray Plaza across from Mears Park, and Wells Fargo Place. Downtown hosts several parks, most notably Rice Park, one of the oldest parks in the country. The street life has been improving in some areas of downtown, including Mears Park bars and restaurants and along Wabasha and St. Peter Streets, where a small collection of restaurants has developed. The extensive skyway system connecting most of the office buildings has contributed to the removal of foot traffic from the streets.

== See also ==
- Neighborhoods of Minneapolis
