= Pratt, Minnesota =

Pratt
- Unincorporated community
- Location within Minnesota Location within the United States
- Coordinates: 44°01′21″N 93°09′34″W
- Country: United States
- State: Minnesota
- County: Steele
- Township: Aurora Township and Havana Township
- Elevation: 1,234 ft (376 m)
- Time zone: UTC-6 (Central (CST))
  - Summer (DST): UTC-5 (CDT)
- ZIP code: 55060
- Area code: 507
- GNIS feature ID: 654892

Pratt is an unincorporated community in Steele County, Minnesota, United States.

== Geography ==
The community is located southeast of Owatonna along U.S. Highway 218 near Steele County Road 6, Austin Road. Pratt is located within Aurora Township and Havana Township. SE 48th Street is also in the immediate area. Turtle Creek flows nearby. Nearby places include Owatonna, Owatonna Township, Somerset Township, and Bixby.

== History ==
A post office called Pratt was established in 1879, and remained in operation until 1955. The community was named for William A. Pratt, an early settler.
