= Interstate 35 in Minnesota =

Section of Interstate Highway in Minnesota, United States

Interstate 35
- Blue Star Memorial Highway; 34th Infantry (Red Bull) Division Highway
- I-35 and I-35E highlighted in red

Route information
- Maintained by MnDOT
- Length: 220.46 mi (354.80 km)
- Existed: 1958–present
- History: Under construction: 1958–1992
- NHS: Entire route

Southern section
- South end: I-35 / Iowa 27 near Albert Lea
- Major intersections: I-90 in Albert Lea; US 14 / US 218 at Owatonna
- North end: I-35E / I-35W at Burnsville

Northern section
- South end: I-35E / I-35W at Columbus
- Major intersections: US 8 at Forest Lake; US 61 at Wyoming; MN 23 west at Mora; US 2 at Duluth; I-535 / US 53 at Duluth
- North end: MN 61 at Duluth

Location
- Country: United States
- State: Minnesota
- Counties: Freeborn, Steele, Rice, Scott, Dakota; Anoka, Washington, Chisago, Pine, Carlton, St. Louis

Highway system
- Interstate Highway System; Main; Auxiliary; Suffixed; Business; Future; Minnesota Trunk Highway System; Interstate; US; State; Legislative; Scenic
← MN 34	→ I-35E

Interstate 35 (I-35) is a north–south Interstate Highway that stretches from Laredo, Texas, to Duluth, Minnesota. In the US state of Minnesota, I-35 enters from Iowa and heads north toward the twin cities of Minneapolis and Saint Paul. South of the metropolitan area, I-35 splits into two branches; I-35E runs through Saint Paul and I-35W through Minneapolis. These two branches rejoin north of the Twin Cities, and the highway continues north to Duluth, where it terminates at State Highway 61 (MN 61). The highway was authorized in 1956 and the first segment opened in 1958. It reached Duluth in 1971, and the final segment to east Duluth opened in 1992.

== Route description ==
I-35 enters the state from Iowa near Albert Lea. It heads roughly due north toward the Twin Cities, where it splits into I-35E and I-35W. The two halves of I-35 rejoin north of the Twin Cities. From there, I-35 travels north-northeast; south of Duluth, it becomes more northeasterly. The route ends near the shore of Lake Superior in Duluth. The entire route is officially designated the Red Bull Highway, named after the 34th Infantry (Red Bull) Division. Legally, I-35 is defined as Routes 390, 395, and 396 in the Minnesota Statutes §161.12(2), but the route is not marked with those numbers. The I-35 legislative route designation and mileposts follow I-35E in the Twin Cities area.

=== Southern segment ===
I-35 enters the state in Freeborn County south of Albert Lea. The first one mile (1.6 km) northbound contains a rest area and Minnesota welcome center. Shortly after the first exit, for County Road 5 (CR 5), there is a sweeping S-curve to the northwest and back to the north. The exit for CR 13 marks the last exit before Albert Lea. Up to here, the Interstate roughly marked the halfway point between U.S. Route 65 (US 65) and US 69. Both U.S. Highways end in Albert Lea.

In Albert Lea, it curves to the northeast and meets US 65, which passes beneath the Interstate. US 65 picks up Business Loop Interstate 35 (BL I-35), which follows the US Highway through the city. It then crosses Albert Lea Lake of a pair of 0.25-mile-long (0.40 km) bridges. It straightens back to the north to meet CR 46, which follows the former route of US 16. Shortly after that interchange, it intersects the national northern end of US 65; access to US 65 there is limited to the southbound lanes of I-35, and traffic from US 65 can only access the northbound lanes of I-35. At the northeastern edge of Albert Lea, there is an interchange with I-90, which directs traffic toward La Crosse, Wisconsin, or Sioux Falls, South Dakota.

I-35 continues north through the rolling hills of southern Minnesota. At Clarks Grove, it intersects MN 251. Between there and the CR 35 exit to Geneva, it passes to the west of Geneva Lake. Just east of Ellendale is an interchange with MN 30. Exit 32, CR 4 to Hope, is the last interchange before Owatonna. On the southern edge of Owatonna is a cloverleaf interchange with US 14. North of CR 45, the CR 34 exit serves northern Owatonna and provides access to the Owatonna Degner Regional Airport. The CR 9 exit serves Clinton Falls and a Cabela's store.

Further north, I-35 meets CR 12 and CR 23 in Medford. Along CR 23, which serves as a western frontage road to I-35, lies an outlet mall. Now in Rice County, the Interstate approaches Faribault. Exit 55 only serves exiting northbound traffic and entering southbound traffic. MN 60 is the main east–west street through Faribault, and MN 21 provides access to Faribault from the north of town. To the south, MN 21 ends at MN 60, but the road continues south and reconnects to I-35 at exit 55.

North of Faribault, the Interstate heads due north before the two directions are briefly separated when they enter a corridor of trees. The route straightens out again and intersects CR 1 and MN 19 at diamond interchanges spaced three miles (4.8 km) apart. It briefly enters Scott County where it meets CR 2 near Elko New Market. It then enters Dakota County and the Minneapolis–St. Paul metropolitan area.

In southwestern Lakeville, there is a folded diamond interchange with CR 70. Right before a partial cloverleaf interchange with CR 60, the Interstate crosses Marion Lake. Shortly after an interchange with CR 5 and CR 50, there is a park and ride complex on the northbound side of the Interstate. An entrance and exit ramp provide access to the Interstate while two entrances from Kenrick Avenue, a frontage road, provide non-Interstate access to the complex. After the CR 46 interchange, the Interstate enters Burnsville. A half diamond interchange, with only northbound exit and southbound entrance ramps, immediately precedes the split. I-35 splits into I-35W and I-35E (signed for Minneapolis and Saint Paul, respectively).

=== Northern segment ===
I-35W and I-35E join again at Columbus, near Forest Lake. The route then continues as I-35. In contrast to the rolling terrain of I-35 south of the Twin Cities area, this region is quite flat. This is the Anoka Sand Plain, an area that was formed by outwash under the last glaciers that lay over this area as they melted. This is an extensive region that continues north for another 20 miles (32 km). The urban sprawl of the northern Twin Cities continues along I-35 to North Branch.

In Pine City and Hinckley, there are museums near I-35: the Pine City one at a refurbished fur trading post and interpretive center and the Hinckley one commemorating the Great Hinckley Forest Fire that occurred in 1894. Motorists who take BL I-35 through Pine City can experience a quintessential all-American main street.

Between Sandstone and Moose Lake, the landscape around I-35 makes a dramatic change. Exposed granite can be seen at the surface, and the deciduous forest changes to evergreens.

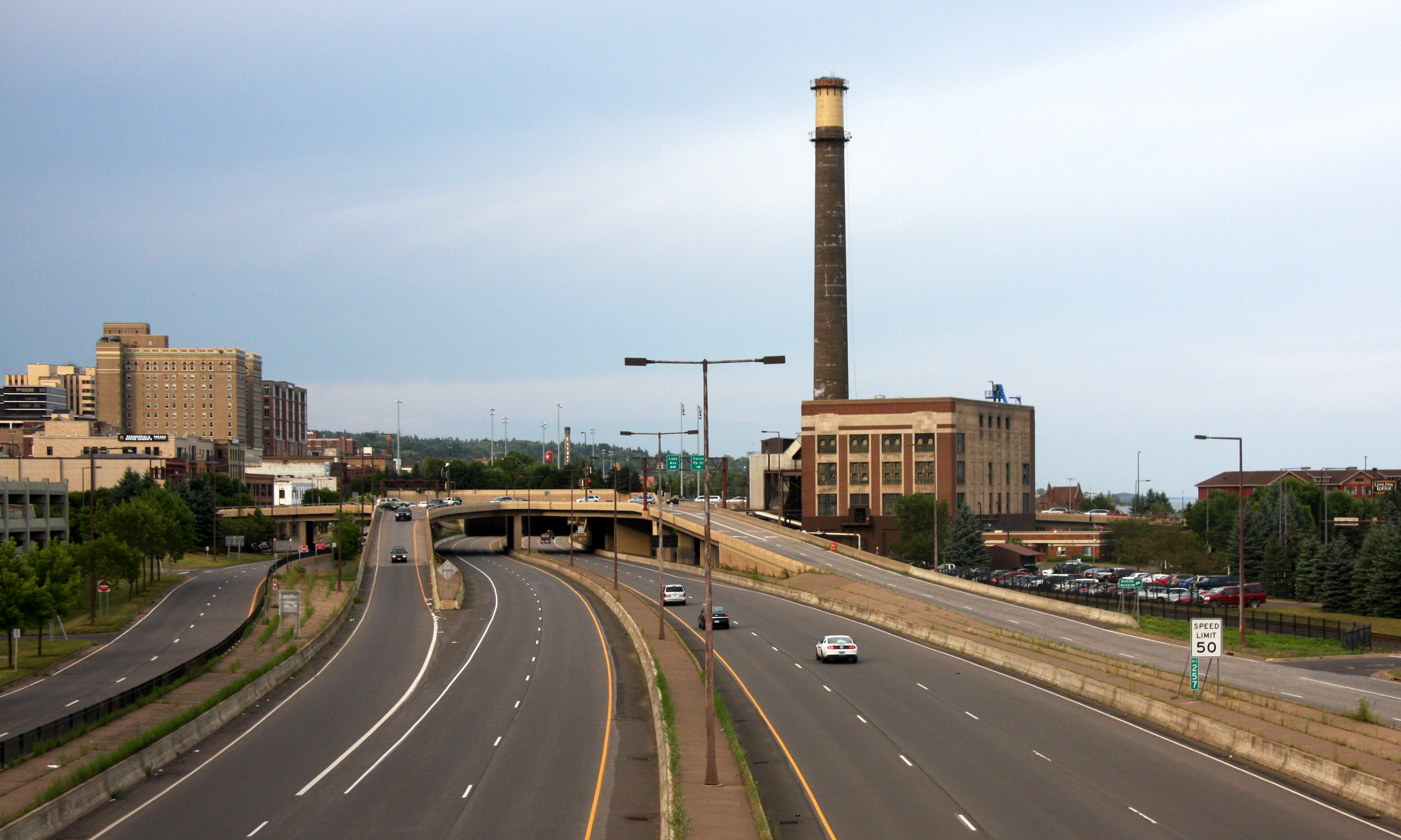
I-35 near downtown Duluth

I-35 climbs Thompson Hill as it approaches the city of Duluth. As the highway enters the city limits at Boundary Avenue, the Saint Louis Bay and Lake Superior are in view. I-35 then descends Thompson Hill into Duluth, with numerous exits. The freeway has an interchange with I-535/US 53, known locally as the "Can of Worms". The junction features a pair of left exits from I-35, a stoplight, and lane drops over the I-35 bridge.

I-35 then proceeds to downtown Duluth. After multiple exits, I-35 leaves the downtown area and follows the Lake Superior shoreline for two miles (3.2 km) to its national northern terminus at its junction with MN 61 and 26th Avenue East. At this junction where I-35 ends, MN 61 begins its route northeast along the North Shore of Lake Superior.

=== Transit ===
Jefferson Lines provides intercity bus service along the length of I-35 in Minnesota serving over a dozen communities along the route with transfer locations in Albert Lea, the Twin Cities, and Duluth.

== History ==
I-35 in Minnesota was authorized as part of the primary Interstate network in 1956. It was mostly constructed in the 1960s. The route in Minnesota replaced portions of old US 61 and old US 65.

I-35 was generally constructed along former routes of US 65 south of the Twin Cities and US 61 north of the Twin Cities.

The first section to be constructed (the first Interstate Highway opened in Minnesota) was about 10 miles (16 km) north of Owatonna, immediately west of present-day Steele CR 45 and Rice CR 45, which opened August 21, 1958.

By 1961, the section of I-35 around Hinckley and Sandstone was under construction.

Three lanes each way have been constructed on I-35 between the I-35E/I-35W split at Columbus to US 8 at Forest Lake. Three lanes have also been constructed on I-35 northbound at Thompson Hill, right before entering the city of Duluth. Additionally, three lanes have been constructed on I-35 southbound in Duluth at Thompson Hill between Central Avenue and US 2 westbound. Three lanes in each direction have also been constructed on I-35 in Duluth between the Can of Worms interchange (I-535/US 53) and the Mesaba Avenue interchange.

From November 1971 to October 1987, the national northern terminus for I-35 was its interchange with Mesaba Avenue in Duluth.

The last section of I-35 in Minnesota to be constructed was around downtown Duluth. The I-35 extension to Lake Avenue in Duluth was open to traffic in October 1987. The temporary I-35 extension to 10th Avenue East in Duluth was open to traffic in November 1989. The I-35 extension to its present-day junction with 26th Avenue East and MN 61 in Duluth was open to traffic in October 1992 after the construction of the Leif Erickson Tunnel. The section marked the final segment of the I-35 to be opened, and one of the last segments of the original Interstate Highway System.

In 2002, all of I-35 in the state of Minnesota, from the Iowa state line to the city of Duluth, was officially designated the Red Bull Highway, after the 34th Infantry (Red Bull) Division, though plans to create signage never came to fruition. In practice, this name is seldom, if ever, used.

In 2021, a new group, the Duluth Waterfront Collective, proposed to replace the riverfront highway portion of I-35 in Duluth with an at-grade boulevard and green space.

== Exit list ==
County	Location	mi	km	Exit	Destinations	Notes
Minnesota–Iowa line		0.000	0.000		I-35 south / Iowa 27 south – Des Moines	Continuation into Iowa
Freeborn	Freeman Township	2.492– 2.522	4.010– 4.059	2	CSAH 5	
Freeborn	Freeman Township	5.276	8.491	5	CSAH 13 – Twin Lakes, Glenville	
Freeborn	Albert Lea	7.987– 7.995	12.854– 12.867	8	I-35 BL north / US 65 – Albert Lea, Glenville	
Freeborn	Albert Lea	11.498	18.504	11	CSAH 46 – Albert Lea	Former US-16
Freeborn	Albert Lea	12.560– 12.654	20.213– 20.365	12	I-35 BL south / US 65 south – Albert Lea	Southbound exit and northbound entrance; northern terminus of US 65
Freeborn	Bancroft Township	13.247	21.319	13	I-90 – La Crosse, Sioux Falls	Signed as exits 13A (east) and 13B (west); I-90 exit 159
Freeborn	Clarks Grove	18.745	30.167	18	MN 251 east – Clarks Grove, Hollandale	
Freeborn	Geneva Township	22.963	36.955	22	CSAH 35 – Hartland, Geneva	
Steele	Summit Township	26.640	42.873	26	MN 30 – New Richland, Blooming Prairie	
Steele	Somerset Township	32.817	52.814	32	CSAH 4 – Hope	
Steele	Owatonna	39.981	64.343	40	US 14 / US 218 south – Waseca, Rochester, Austin	Former southern end of US 14 concurrency; northern terminus of US 218
Steele	Owatonna	41.766	67.216	41	Bridge Street	
Steele	Owatonna	42.509	68.412	42	CSAH 45 / CSAH 2	Former northern end of US 14 concurrency; signed as exits 42A (east) and 42B (west)
Steele	Owatonna	43.524– 43.548	70.045– 70.084	43	CSAH 34 (26th Street)	
Steele	Owatonna	45.520– 45.544	73.257– 73.296	45	CSAH 9 – Clinton Falls	
Steele	Medford	48.057	77.340	48	CSAH 12 / CSAH 23 – Medford	
Rice	Faribault	55.590	89.463	55	I-35 BL / CSAH 48 / Lyndale Avenue – Faribault	Northbound exit and southbound entrance
Rice	Faribault	56.918	91.601	56	MN 60 – Faribault, Waterville	
Rice	Faribault	59.107	95.123	59	I-35 BL / MN 21 – Faribault, Le Center	
Rice	Forest Township	66.696	107.337	66	CSAH 1 – Montgomery, Dundas	
Rice	Webster Township	69.679	112.137	69	MN 19 – Northfield, New Prague, Lonsdale	Access to Northfield City Hospital
Scott	New Market Township	76.841	123.664	76	CSAH 2 – Elko New Market	
Dakota	Lakeville	81.842	131.712	81	CSAH 70 – Lakeville, Farmington	
Dakota	Lakeville	84.340	135.732	84	CSAH 60 (185th Street West)	
Dakota	Lakeville	85.509	137.613	85	CSAH 5 / CSAH 50	
Dakota	Lakeville	85.953	138.328	–	Kenrick Avenue Park and Ride station	Buses only; northbound exit and entrance
Dakota	Lakeville	86.636	139.427	86	CSAH 46	Public access to Kenrick Avenue Park and Ride station
Dakota	Burnsville	87.824	141.339	87	Crystal Lake Road	Northbound exit and southbound entrance
Dakota	Burnsville	88.268	142.054	88A	I-35W north – Minneapolis I-35E north – St. Paul	I-35 north splits into I-35W and I-35E; left exit 88A is for I-35W
See I-35W and I-35E
Anoka	Columbus	127.497	205.187	127	I-35W south – Minneapolis I-35E south – St. Paul	I-35 south splits into I-35W and I-35E; exit number is for I-35W
Anoka	Columbus	129.467	208.357	129	MN 97 / CSAH 23	
Washington	Forest Lake	131.773	212.068	131	CSAH 2 to US 8 – Forest Lake	
Washington	Forest Lake	132.279	212.882	132	US 8 east – Taylors Falls	Northbound exit and southbound entrance; western terminus of US 8
Chisago	Wyoming	135.721	218.422	135	US 61 south / CSAH 22 – Wyoming	Northern terminus of US 61
Chisago	Stacy	139.983	225.281	139	CSAH 19 – Stacy	
Chisago	Lent Township	143.762	231.363	143	CSAH 17	
Chisago	North Branch	147.928	238.067	147	MN 95 – Cambridge, North Branch	
Chisago	Harris	152.610	245.602	152	CSAH 10 – Harris	
Chisago	Rush City	159.994	257.485	159	CSAH 1 – Rush City	
Pine	Rock Creek	165.707	266.680	165	MN 70 – Rock Creek, Grantsburg	
Pine	Pine City	169.567	272.892	169	I-35 BL / CSAH 7 – Pine City	
Pine	Pine City	171.358	275.774	171	I-35 BL / CSAH 11	
Pine	Mission Creek Township	175.350	282.198	175	CSAH 14 – Beroun	
Pine	Mission Creek Township	180.400	290.326	180	MN 23 west / CSAH 61 south – Mora	Southern end of MN 23 concurrency
Pine	Hinckley	183.105	294.679	183	MN 48 east (Fire Monument Road) / CSAH 61 (Old Highway 61) – Hinckley	Western terminus of MN 48; access to CSAH 61 via CSAH 61 Spur (Fire Monument Rd. west)
Pine	Sandstone	191.382	307.999	191	MN 23 east / CSAH 61 – Sandstone	Northern end of MN 23 concurrency; former US 61
Pine	Finlayson Township	195.615	314.812	195	MN 18 / MN 23 – Askov, Finlayson	
Pine	Willow River	205.477	330.683	205	CSAH 43 – Bruno, Willow River	
Pine	Windemere Township	209.889	337.784	209	CSAH 46 – Sturgeon Lake	
Carlton	Moose Lake	214.694	345.517	214	MN 73 – Moose Lake	
Carlton	Moose Lake Township	216.080	347.747	216	MN 27 / CSAH 8 – Moose Lake	Southbound exit and northbound entrance
Carlton	Barnum	220.637	355.081	220	CSAH 6 – Barnum	
Carlton	Mahtowa Township	227.354	365.891	227	CSAH 4 – Mahtowa, Wrenshall	
Carlton	Twin Lakes Township	235.487	378.980	235	MN 210 – Carlton, Cromwell	
Carlton	Cloquet	237.227	381.780	237	MN 33 – Cloquet, Iron Range	
Carlton	Scanlon	239.204	384.962	239	MN 45 south / CSAH 45 north – Cloquet, Scanlon	
Carlton	Thomson Township	242.157	389.714	242	CSAH 1 – Esko	
Carlton–St. Louis county line	Thomson–Midway township line	245.199– 245.259	394.610– 394.706	245	CSAH 61	
St. Louis	Midway Township	246.351– 246.396	396.464– 396.536	246	CSAH 13 (Midway Road)	
St. Louis	Proctor	249.627	401.736	249	Boundary Avenue / Skyline Parkway	
St. Louis	Duluth	250.667	403.409	250	US 2 west – Grand Rapids, Proctor	Southern end of US 2 concurrency; southbound exit and northbound entrance
St. Louis	Duluth	251.229– 251.395	404.314– 404.581	251A	Cody Street	Northbound exit and southbound entrance
St. Louis	Duluth	252.054	405.642	251B	MN 23 (Grand Avenue)	Southbound exit and northbound entrance
St. Louis	Duluth	252.419	406.229	252	Central Avenue	
St. Louis	Duluth	253.173	407.442	253A	US 2 east / LSCT (Bong Bridge) – Wisconsin	Northern end of US 2 concurrency; southern end of LSCT concurrency
St. Louis	Duluth	253.701	408.292	253B	40th Avenue West	
St. Louis	Duluth	254.845	410.133	254	27th Avenue West	
St. Louis	Duluth	255.395	411.018	255	I-535 south / US 53 (21st Avenue West) – Wisconsin	Northern terminus of I-535
St. Louis	Duluth	256.248– 256.272	412.391– 412.430	256A	MN 194 (Mesaba Avenue) / Superior Street	Northbound exit and southbound entrance
St. Louis	Duluth	256.809– 257.250	413.294– 414.004	256B	5th Avenue West / Lake Avenue	
St. Louis	Duluth	259.062	416.920	258	21st Avenue East	Northbound exit and southbound entrance
St. Louis	Duluth	259.606– 259.639	417.795– 417.848	259	MN 61 north / LSCT (London Road) / 26th Avenue – North Shore	Northern terminus; northbound exit only; northern end of LSCT concurrency; London Rd. is former US 61; road continues west as 26th Avenue
1.000 mi = 1.609 km; 1.000 km = 0.621 mi: Concurrency terminus; HOV only; Incomplete access; Route transition

Interstate 35
Previous state: Iowa	Minnesota	Next state: Terminus
