= Litomysl, Minnesota =

Litomysl
- Unincorporated community
- Location within Minnesota Location within the United States
- Coordinates: 43°56′50″N 93°11′10″W
- Country: United States
- State: Minnesota
- County: Steele
- Township: Somerset Township
- Elevation: 1,273 ft (388 m)
- Time zone: UTC-6 (Central (CST))
  - Summer (DST): UTC-5 (CDT)
- ZIP code: 55060
- Area code: 507
- GNIS feature ID: 654799

Litomysl is an unincorporated community in Somerset Township, Steele County, Minnesota, United States. The community is located near the junction of Steele County Roads 4 (SE 98th Street) and 27 (SE 24th Avenue). Nearby places include Hope, Bixby, and Owatonna.
