= U.S. Route 218 =

Highway in the United States

U.S. Route 218
- US 218 highlighted in red

Route information
- Auxiliary route of US 18
- Length: 321.734 mi (517.781 km): Iowa: 274.995 mi (442.562 km); Minn: 46.739 mi (75.219 km)
- Existed: 1926–present

Major junctions
- South end: US 136 at Keokuk, IA
- US 61 at Keokuk, IA; US 34 at Mount Pleasant, IA; I-80 / I-380 at Coralville, IA; I-380 / US 30 / US 151 / Iowa 27 in Cedar Rapids, IA; I-380 / US 20 / Iowa 27 at Waterloo, IA; US 63 at Waterloo, IA; US 18 / Iowa 27 at Floyd, IA; I-90 at Austin, MN
- North end: I-35 / US 14 at Owatonna, MN

Location
- Country: United States
- States: Iowa; Minnesota
- Counties: Iowa; Lee; Henry; Washington; Johnson; Linn; Benton; Black Hawk; Bremer; Chickasaw; Floyd; Mitchell; Minnesota; Mower; Dodge; Steele

Highway system
- United States Numbered Highway System; List; Special; Divided
← Iowa 212	IA	→ Iowa 220
← MN 217	MN	→ MN 219

U.S. Highway 218 (US 218) is a United States Highway that was created in 1926. Although technically a spur of US 18, US 218 neither begins nor ends at US 18, but overlaps US 18 for eight miles (13 km) near Charles City, Iowa. US 218 begins at U.S. 136 in downtown Keokuk and ends 319 miles (513 km) away at Interstate 35 (I-35) and US 14 at Owatonna, Minnesota. A large portion of US 218 in Iowa is part of the Avenue of the Saints, which connects St. Louis, Missouri, and Saint Paul, Minnesota.

== Route description ==
=== Iowa ===
US 218 begins in downtown Keokuk at an intersection with US 136 and US 61 Business (US 61 Bus.) at Main and 7th streets. The highway heads north along Main Street with US 61 Bus. As they exit Keokuk, the business route ends at an intersection with the mainline US 61, which bypasses the city. US 218 and US 61 head north concurrently for a few miles before US 218 exits to the northwest; US 61 follows the Mississippi River north towards Fort Madison. US 218 travels northwesterly for almost ten miles (16 km) along a two-lane road. As it approaches Donnellson, it meets up with and joins Iowa Highway 27 (Iowa 27), the Avenue of the Saints.

The two highways head north on a four-lane expressway. In Donnellson, they meet Iowa 2 at a diamond interchange. Further north, and east of Houghton, they intersect Iowa 16 at an at-grade intersection. Prior to crossing the Skunk River, the roadway angles to the northeast and a freeway bypass of Mount Pleasant begins. From the east, the highways are joined by US 34 and Iowa 163. The four highways loop around the city's eastern side and begin traversing the northern side when US 34 and Iowa 163 split away to continue bypassing Mount Pleasant; US 218 and Iowa 27 continue north.

From Mount Pleasant it continues to the Iowa City area, which it bypasses to the south and west. The US 218/IA27 concurrency intersects with I-80, and continues north with I-380 towards Cedar Rapids. There US 218 diverges from IA 27 and joins the US30/US151 bypass of south Cedar Rapids. US 151 heads south at Exit 248, and the US 30/218 concurrency continues west for 15 miles, where US 30 continues on as a 4 lane highway and US 218 exits north as a rural 2 lane highway. US 218 heads northwest through Vinton, La Porte City, and Washburn before it reaches Waterloo.

Route 218 remains a 2 lane highway until it becomes a freeway right before US 20 and once again joins I-380 for a couple miles to downtown Waterloo. When I-380 ends, US 218 continues through downtown Waterloo and then to Cedar Falls, where it crosses the Cedar River. It continues northwest as a 4 lane highway through Waverly, Charles City, and Osage until the Minnesota state line.

=== Minnesota ===
US 218 enters the state at Lyle, in Mower County. It follows along the east side of the Iowa, Chicago, and Eastern Railroad line as it continues northward through farm fields. Southeast of Austin, US 218 angles northeastward to bypass the city, its former route following County Road 45 (CR 45) into town.

US 218 passes by the Austin Municipal Airport just before its interchange with I-90. The highway runs concurrently with I-90 for nearly three miles (4.8 km) through northern Austin. When US 218 departs from the Interstate and turns back north, it becomes a four-lane divided highway for a short distance. After its junction with State Highway 251 (MN 251), the highway angles north-northwestward again following the IC&E rail line, this time on the west side of the tracks.

The highway enters Dodge County for less than a mile, then reaches Steele County, Blooming Prairie, and an eight-block-long concurrency with MN 30. It continues north-northwesterly after leaving Blooming Prairie, traveling through predominantly agricultural scenery. It passes by Oak Glen Lake before going through the unincorporated community of Bixby.

After passing through the unincorporated community of Pratt, US 218 meets US 14 at a folded diamond interchange. US 218 runs westward concurrently with US 14, while its historic route through downtown Owatonna continues ahead as CR 48. After an interchange with CR 45 (former US 65), US 14/US 218 passes by Kaplan's Woods Park and reaches I-35, where US 218 ends.

Legally, the Minnesota section of US 218 is defined as Route 40 in Minnesota Statutes § 161.114(2).

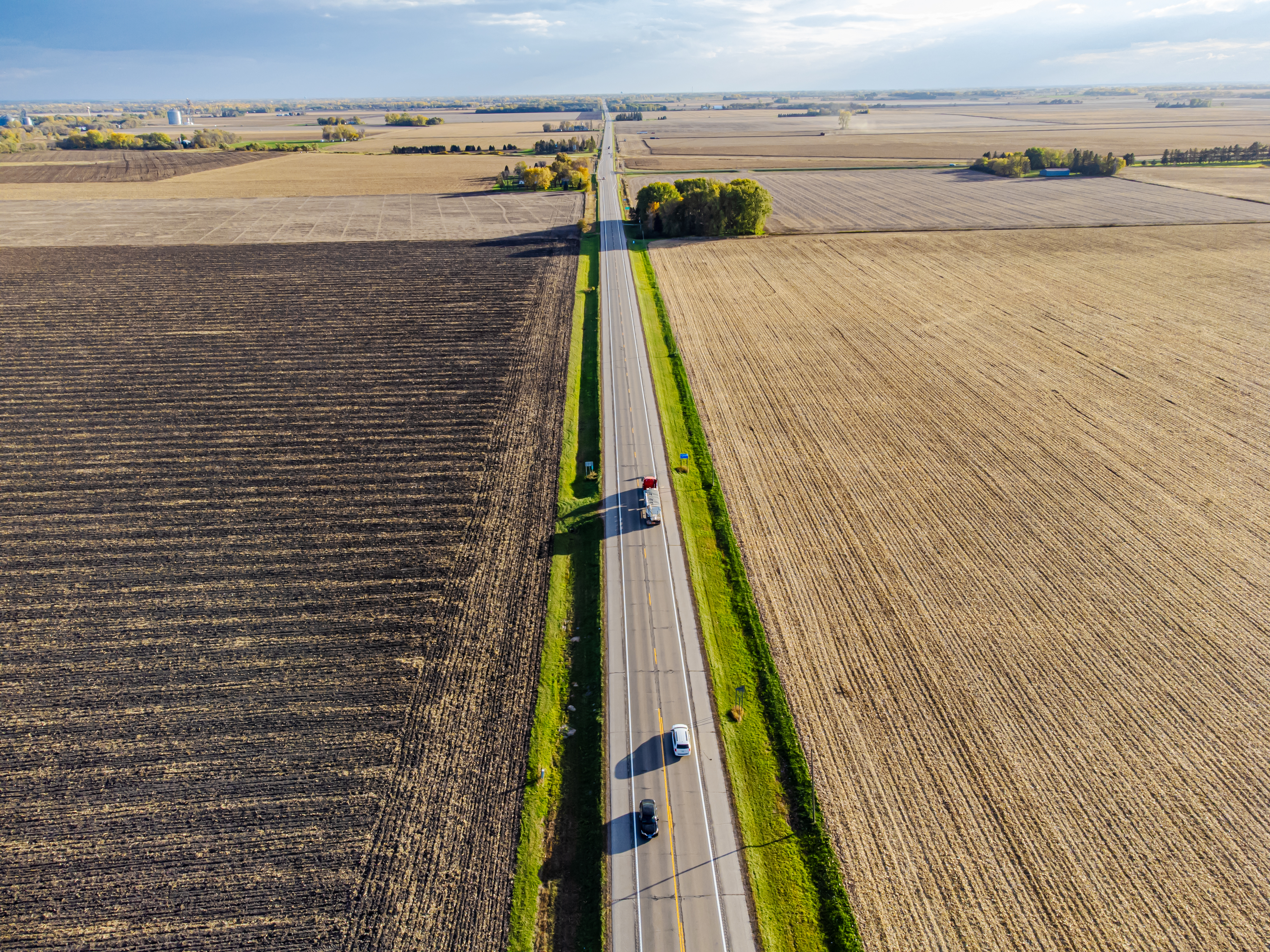
US-218 in Southern Minnesota

== History ==
In 1913, work began on the road that became US 218, when it was an auto trail called the Red Ball Route because the original route was marked with poles which had red balls, six inches (150 mm) in diameter, mounted on each side. In 1920, the Minnesota portion of the route was designated as Constitutional Route 40, as part of the Babcock Amendment that established the Minnesota trunk highway system.

In Iowa, US 218 was extended from its previous southern terminus, at its intersection with US 30 in Benton County, in 1934 when US 161 was split and renamed. The former US 161 had extended from Dubuque, through Cedar Rapids, to Keokuk. After the split, the section of former US 161 from Dubuque to Cedar Rapids extended US 151 south, and the section of US 30 from the former terminus of US 218 to its intersection with the former US 161 in Cedar Rapids, along with the section of former US 161 from Cedar Rapids to Keokuk, extended US 218 south.

In 1965, US 218 was rerouted along bypasses of Austin, Minnesota and Owatonna, Minnesota, the latter following a route that would become the US 14 bypass of that city.

In 1985, US 218 was bypassed around Iowa City and Coralville, joining I-380 at the I-80 interchange. US 218 to Cedar Rapids was replaced by Iowa 965.

The interchange with I-80 and I-380/US 218/Iowa 27 in Coralville was converted from a cloverleaf to a turbine interchange to eliminate weaving.

== Major intersections ==
State	County	Location	mi	km	Exit	Destinations	Notes
Iowa	Lee	Keokuk	0.000	0.000		US 136 west / US 61 Bus. south (7th Street) / US 136 east (Main Street)	Southern end of US 61 Bus. overlap
Iowa	Lee	Keokuk	3.480	5.601		US 61 south / US 61 Bus. ends	Southern end of US 61 overlap; northern end of US 61 Bus.
Iowa	Lee	Montrose Township	9.132	14.697		US 61 north	Northern end of US 61 overlap
Iowa	Lee	Charleston Township	18.746	30.169	18	Iowa 27 south – St. Louis	Southern end of Iowa 27 overlap; exit 10 on Iowa 27/Ave. of the Saints
Iowa	Lee	Donnellson	20.673	33.270	19	Iowa 2 – Donnellson, Fort Madison	
Iowa	Lee	Marion Township	30.760	49.503		Iowa 16	
Iowa	Henry	Mount Pleasant	41.663	67.050	40	255th Street – Mount Pleasant	
Iowa	Henry	Mount Pleasant	43.349	69.763	42	US 34 east / US 218 Bus. / Iowa 163 east – Mount Pleasant, Burlington	Southern end of US 34 overlap; signed as exits 42A (east) and 42B (west)
Iowa	Henry	Mount Pleasant	45.787– 47.223	73.687– 75.998	45	US 218 Bus. (Iowa 438) to US 34 west / Iowa 163 west – Mount Pleasant, Ottumwa	Northern end of US 34 overlap; US 218 Bus. only signed southbound
Iowa	Henry	Olds	55.447	89.233		Iowa 78	
Iowa	Washington	Oregon Township	67.581	108.761	66	Iowa 92 – Washington, Columbus Junction	Also serves Ainsworth and Cotter
Iowa	Washington	Oregon Township	70.960	114.199	70	CR G36	
Iowa	Washington	Riverside	81.072	130.473	80	Iowa 22 – Kalona, Lone Tree	
Iowa	Johnson	Liberty Township	85.534	137.654	85	Hills	
Iowa	Johnson	West Lucas Township	89.708	144.371	89	Riverside Drive, Airport	
Iowa	Johnson	Iowa City	91.318	146.962	91	Iowa 1 – Iowa City, Kalona	
Iowa	Johnson	Iowa City	93.561	150.572	93	Melrose Avenue – University Heights	
Iowa	Johnson	Coralville	96.934	156.000	97 0	I-80 – Iowa City, Davenport, Des Moines I-380 begins	Northbound exit numbers follow mileage of US 218; signed as exits 97A (eastbound) and 97B (westbound); southbound exit numbers follow mileage of I-380, signed as exits 0A (eastbound) and 0B (westbound)
Iowa	Johnson	Coralville–North Liberty line	98.974	159.283	2	Forevergreen Road	
Iowa	Johnson	North Liberty	100.980	162.512	4	CR F28 – north Liberty	
Iowa	Johnson	Shueyville	107.791	173.473	10	CR F12 – Swisher, Shueyville	
Iowa	Linn	Cedar Rapids	110.750	178.235	13	Wright Brothers Boulevard SW – Ely, The Eastern Iowa Airport	Former Iowa 84
Iowa	Linn	Cedar Rapids	113.263	182.279	16A	I-380 north / US 30 east / US 151 north / Iowa 27 north	Northern end of I-380 and Iowa 27 overlaps; southern end of US 30 and US 151 overlaps
Iowa	Linn	Cedar Rapids	113.596	182.815	252A	6th Street SW	Exit numbers follow US 30
Iowa	Linn	Cedar Rapids	115.780	186.330	250	Edgewood Road SW	
Iowa	Linn	Cedar Rapids	117.151	188.536	248	US 151 south / US 151 Bus. (Williams Boulevard SW)	Northern end of US 151 overlap
Iowa	Linn	Clinton Township	119.130– 119.651	191.721– 192.560	246	Iowa 100 / 16th Avenue / 80th Street – Fairfax	Interchange under reconstruction to connect to Iowa 100
Iowa	Benton	Eldorado Township	135.239	217.646		US 30 west	End of US 30 overlap
Iowa	Benton	Vinton	148.199	238.503		Iowa 150 north	
Iowa	Benton	Monroe Township	158.602	255.245		Iowa 8 west	
Iowa	Black Hawk	Waterloo	179.468	288.826	71	I-380 south / US 20 / Iowa 27 – Cedar Falls, Cedar Rapids, Dubuque	Southern end of I-380 overlap; signed as exits 71A (eastbound) and 71B (westbound); exit numbers follow I-380
Iowa	Black Hawk	Waterloo	180.535	290.543	72	San Marnan Drive	Access to Covenant Medical Center
Iowa	Black Hawk	Waterloo	181.116	291.478		I-380 ends	Northern end of I-380; exit numbers follow US 218
Iowa	Black Hawk	Waterloo	182.864– 183.102	294.291– 294.674	181A	US 63 north – Downtown Riverfront, Young Arena, Sullivan Brothers Convention Center	No northbound entrance; signed as exit 180 southbound; access to Allen Hospital
Iowa	Black Hawk	Waterloo	183.425	295.194	181B	US 63 south / University Avenue	No southbound entrance; signed as exit 181 southbound
Iowa	Black Hawk	Waterloo	184.201– 184.785	296.443– 297.383	182	Fletcher Avenue, Ansborough Avenue	
Iowa	Black Hawk	Waterloo	185.659	298.789	184	Greenhill Road	
Iowa	Black Hawk	Waterloo	187.228	301.314	185	Broadway Street, Airport	
Iowa	Black Hawk	Cedar Falls	189.067	304.274	—	Iowa 27 south / Iowa 57 west / Iowa 58 south – Cedar Falls, Hudson, UNI, UNI-Dome	Southern end of Iowa 27 overlap
Iowa	Black Hawk	Cedar Falls	190.719	306.932	189	Lone Tree Road	
Iowa	Black Hawk	Washington Township	193.565	311.513	192	CR C57 (W. Cedar–Wapsi Road)	Interchange opened October 2016
Iowa	Bremer	Janesville	196.765	316.663	195	CR C50 – Janesville	
Iowa	Bremer	Waverly	200.256	322.281	198	US 218 Bus. – Waverly	Access to Waverly Health Center
Iowa	Bremer	Waverly	204.757	329.524	203	Iowa 3 – Waverly, Shell Rock	
Iowa	Bremer	Waverly	206.757	332.743	205	US 218 Bus. – Waverly Airport	
Iowa	Bremer	Plainfield	214.012	344.419	212	Iowa 188 – Plainfield	
Iowa	Chickasaw	Nashua	221.316	356.174	220	Iowa 346 / CR B60 – Nashua	
Iowa	Floyd	Charles City	230.538	371.015	218	US 18 east / US 218 Bus. / CR T64 – Charles City, New Hampton	Southern end of US 18 overlap; exit numbers follow US 18
Iowa	Floyd	Charles City	234.114	376.770	214	Iowa 14 – Charles City, Greene	
Iowa	Floyd	Charles City	236.238	380.188	212	US 218 Bus. / CR B35 – Charles City	
Iowa	Floyd	Floyd	238.655	384.078		US 18 west / Iowa 27 north	Northern end of US 18 and Iowa 27 overlaps
Iowa	Mitchell	Burr Oak Township	249.987	402.315		Iowa 9 east	Southern end of Iowa 9 overlap
Iowa	Mitchell	Osage	253.985	408.749		Iowa 9 west	Northern end of Iowa 9 overlap
Iowa	Mitchell	St. Ansgar	265.754	427.690		CR 105	
			274.995 0.000	442.562 0.000		Iowa–Minnesota state line	
Minnesota	Mower	Austin	12.195	19.626	180B	I-90 east / CSAH 61 – La Crosse	Eastern end of I-90 overlap
Minnesota	Mower	Austin	12.478	20.081	180A	Oakland Place	Westbound exit and eastbound entrance
Minnesota	Mower	Austin	13.071	21.036	179	11th Drive NE	Interchange
Minnesota	Mower	Austin	13.725	22.088	178B	CR 16 (6th Street NE)	Interchange
Minnesota	Mower	Austin	14.347	23.089	178A	CR 45 (4th Street NW)	Interchange
Minnesota	Mower	Austin	15.031	24.190	177	I-90 west – Albert Lea	Western end of I-90 overlap
Minnesota	Mower	Lansing Township	20.633	33.206		MN 251 west – Hollandale	
Minnesota	Dodge	No major junctions					
Minnesota	Steele	Blooming Prairie	28.365	45.649		MN 30 east – Hayfield	Southern end of MN 30 overlap
Minnesota	Steele	Blooming Prairie	29.459	47.410		MN 30 west – Ellendale	Northern end of MN 30 overlap
Minnesota	Steele	Owatonna Township	43.717	70.356	—	US 14 east / CSAH 48 – Rochester	Eastern end of US 14 overlap
Minnesota	Steele	Owatonna Township	45.539	73.288	—	CSAH 45	Former US 65
Minnesota	Steele	Owatonna Township	46.739	75.219	—	I-35 / US 14 west – Minneapolis, St. Paul, Albert Lea, Waseca	Western end of US 14 overlap; I-35 exit 40
1.000 mi = 1.609 km; 1.000 km = 0.621 mi: Concurrency terminus; Incomplete access

== Related routes ==
=== Mount Pleasant business route ===
U.S. Highway 218 Business
- Location: Mount Pleasant
- Existed: 2003–present

U.S. Highway 218 Business (US 218 Bus.) was designated along a former routing of US 218 through Mount Pleasant, the northernmost 0.7 miles (1.1 km) are officially known as Iowa 438. The routing was created as a result of construction of the Avenue of the Saints corridor through Iowa. The new Avenue of the Saints corridor took US 218/Iowa 27 and US 34 around the eastern and northern edges of Mount Pleasant. The Iowa 438 section of US 218 Bus. serves as a connector from southbound US 218/Iowa 27 to westbound US 34.

=== Waverly business route ===
U.S. Highway 218 Business
- Location: Waverly
- Length: 6.6 mi (10.6 km)
- Existed: December 1998–present

US 218 Business (US 218 Bus.) in Waverly was designated December 2, 1998, on the old segment of US 218 after it was routed around Waverly. The business route spans 6.6 miles (10.6 km). It intersects Iowa 3 in downtown Waverly and the two routes run concurrently for about one mile (1.6 km). South of Iowa 3, US 218 Bus. is officially known as Iowa 116. US 218 Bus. begins at exit 198 on US 218/Iowa 27 south of Waverly and ends at exit 205 on US 218/Iowa 27.

=== Charles City business route ===
U.S. Highway 218 Business
- Location: Charles City
- Existed: 2000–present

US 218 Business (US 218 Bus.) in Charles City was designated along the old alignment of US 218 in 2000 after the construction of the Avenue of the Saints corridor created a bypass around Charles City. Upon its designation, the route was officially known by two Iowa state highways: Iowa 337 and Iowa 162. Iowa 337 was turned over to local jurisdictions in 2001 and Iowa 162 was turned over in 2006 after US 18 was relocated through Charles City.

Browse numbered routes
← Iowa 415	Iowa 438	→ Iowa 922
← Iowa 110	Iowa 116	→ Iowa 117
