= Lemond, Minnesota =

Lemond
- Unincorporated community
- Location within Minnesota Location within the United States
- Coordinates: 43°58′57″N 93°22′49″W
- Country: United States
- State: Minnesota
- County: Steele
- Township: Lemond Township
- Elevation: 1,197 ft (365 m)
- Time zone: UTC-6 (Central (CST))
  - Summer (DST): UTC-5 (CDT)
- ZIP code: 56026 and 55060
- Area code: 507
- GNIS feature ID: 654791

Lemond is an unincorporated community in Lemond Township, Steele County, Minnesota, United States, near Owatonna and Ellendale. The community is located near the junction of Steele County Roads 4 and 7, and SW 89th Avenue.
