= Saco, Minnesota =

Saco
- Unincorporated community
- Location within Minnesota Location within the United States
- Coordinates: 44°00′16″N 93°15′59″W
- Country: United States
- State: Minnesota
- County: Steele
- Township: Somerset Township
- Elevation: 1,217 ft (371 m)
- Time zone: UTC-6 (Central (CST))
  - Summer (DST): UTC-5 (CDT)
- ZIP code: 55060
- Area code: 507
- GNIS feature ID: 654922

Saco is an unincorporated community in Somerset Township, Steele County, Minnesota, United States, near Owatonna and Hope. The community is located near the junction of Steele County Roads 31 (SW 58th Street) and 32 (SW 32nd Avenue).

== History ==
The community was named after Saco, Maine.
