= Epsom, Minnesota =

Epsom
- Unincorporated community
- Location within Minnesota Location within the United States
- Coordinates: 44°15′44″N 93°03′22″W
- Country: United States
- State: Minnesota
- County: Rice County
- Township: Richland Township
- Elevation: 1,119 ft (341 m)
- Time zone: UTC-6 (Central (CST))
  - Summer (DST): UTC-5 (CDT)
- ZIP code: 55946
- Area code: 507
- GNIS feature ID: 654695

Epsom is an unincorporated community in Richland Township, Rice County, Minnesota, United States.

The community is located along Rice County Road 26 (Larson Avenue) near its junction with 230th Street East.

State Highway 60 (MN 60) is also in the immediate area. The North Fork of the Zumbro River flows through the community.

Nearby places include Kenyon, Nerstrand, Faribault, Ruskin, and Moland.

Epsom is located within ZIP code 55946, based in Kenyon. The boundary line between Rice and Goodhue counties is near Epsom.
