= Owatonna =

Owatonna may refer to the following places in Steele County, Minnesota, United States:

- Owatonna, Minnesota, a city
- Owatonna Township, Steele County, Minnesota
