= LeMond (disambiguation) =

Greg LeMond is an American cyclist.

LeMond or Lemond may also refer to:

- LeMond Racing Cycles, a bicycle manufacturer founded by Greg LeMond
- Bob LeMond, American radio and television announcer
- Lemond Township, Steele County, Minnesota, United States
- Lemond (alcohol)

== See also ==
- Le Monde
