= Blooming Prairie =

Blooming Prairie can refer to a location in the United States:

- Blooming Prairie, Minnesota
  - Blooming Prairie High School
- Blooming Prairie Township, Steele County, Minnesota
