= Merton Township =

Merton Township may refer to the following townships in the United States:

- Merton Township, Steele County, Minnesota
- Merton Township, South Dakota
