= Medford Township =

Medford Township may refer to:

- Medford Township, in Reno County, Kansas
- Medford Township, Steele County, Minnesota
- Medford Township, New Jersey
- Medford Township, Walsh County, North Dakota
- Medford Township, Grant County, Oklahoma, see List of Oklahoma townships

== See also ==
- Medford (disambiguation)
