= John S. Biersdorf =

American politician

John Biersdorf
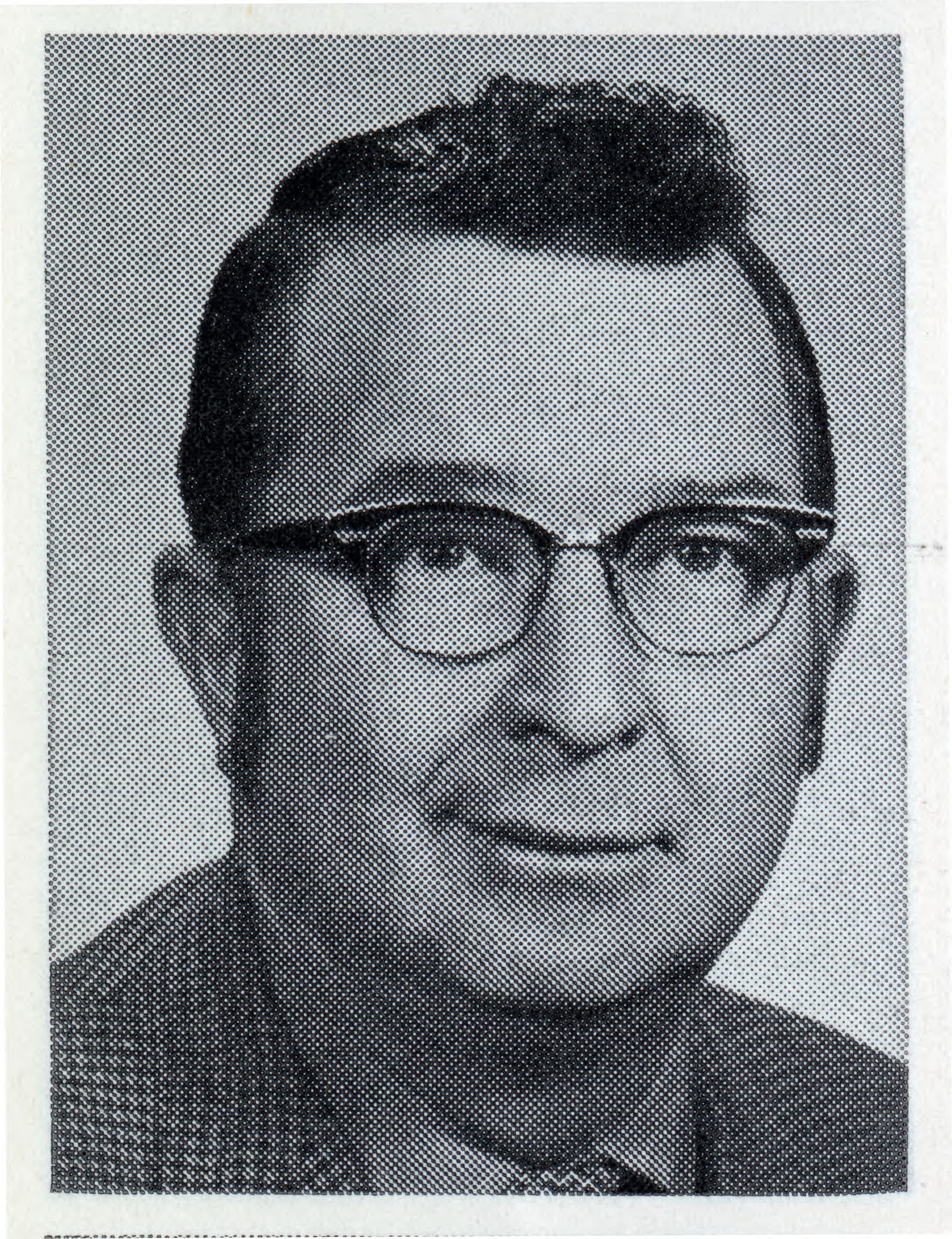
- Biersdorf c. 1973-1974

Member of the Minnesota House of Representatives from the 32A District
- In office January 4, 1971 – January 4, 1981
- Governor: Wendell R. Anderson; Rudy Perpich; Al Quie

Personal details
- Born: October 11, 1925 Deerfield Township, Minnesota, U.S.
- Died: June 1, 2009 (aged 83) Golden Valley, Minnesota, U.S.
- Resting place: Fort Snelling National Cemetery
- Other political affiliations: Republican

Military service
- Allegiance: United States of America
- Branch/service: United States Army
- Years of service: 1943–1945
- Rank: Technician fourth grade
- Unit: 714th Ordnance Company, 89th Infantry Division
- Battles/wars: World War II

John Stephanus Biersdorf (October 11, 1925 – June 1, 2009) was an American politician.

Biersdorf was born on a farm in Deerfield Township, Steele County, Minnesota, near Owatonna, Minnesota and graduated from Owatonna Senior High School. He served in the United States Army during World War II. Biersdorf graduated from University of Minnesota with a degree in business. He was a farmer and involved with the insurance business. Biersdorf lived in Owatonna, Minnesota, with his wife and family, He served on the Owatonna School Board and on the Steele County Conservation Soil Board. Biersdorf also served in the Minnesota House of Representatives from 1971 to 1980 and was a Republican. He died at a health care facility in Golden Valley, Minnesota.
