= Merton, Minnesota =

Merton
- Unincorporated community
- Location within Minnesota Location within the United States
- Coordinates: 44°08′46″N 93°08′48″W
- Country: United States
- State: Minnesota
- County: Steele
- Township: Merton Township
- Elevation: 1,260 ft (380 m)
- Time zone: UTC-6 (Central (CST))
  - Summer (DST): UTC-5 (CDT)
- ZIP code: 55060 and 55049
- Area code: 507
- GNIS feature ID: 654826

Merton is an unincorporated community in Merton Township, Steele County, Minnesota, United States, near Medford and Owatonna. The community is located near the junction of Steele County Roads 8 (Kenyon Road) and 9 (NE 50th Street). Other nearby routes include Steele County Roads 10, 12, and 37. Medford Creek and Rush Creek both flow nearby.
