= Clinton Falls, Minnesota =

Clinton Falls
- Unincorporated community
- Location within Minnesota Location within the United States
- Coordinates: 44°08′20″N 93°14′49″W
- Country: United States
- State: Minnesota
- County: Steele
- Township: Clinton Falls Township
- Elevation: 1,132 ft (345 m)
- Time zone: UTC-6 (Central (CST))
  - Summer (DST): UTC-5 (CDT)
- ZIP code: 55049 and 55060
- Area code: 507
- GNIS feature ID: 641339

Clinton Falls is an unincorporated community in Clinton Falls Township, Steele County, Minnesota, United States.

The community is located between Medford and Owatonna near Interstate 35 and Steele County Road 9. Crane Creek and the Straight River meet near Clinton Falls.

Clinton Falls was platted in 1855. A post office was established at Clinton Falls in 1857, and remained in operation until 1933.

Historical population
Census	Pop.	Note	%±
1880	61		—
U.S. Decennial Census
