= Steele Center, Minnesota =

Steele Center
- Unincorporated community
- Location within Minnesota Location within the United States
- Coordinates: 43°59′22″N 93°13′35″W
- Country: United States
- State: Minnesota
- County: Steele
- Township: Somerset Township
- Elevation: 1,257 ft (383 m)
- Time zone: UTC-6 (Central (CST))
  - Summer (DST): UTC-5 (CDT)
- ZIP code: 55060
- Area code: 507
- GNIS feature ID: 654962

Steele Center is an unincorporated community in Somerset Township, Steele County, Minnesota, United States. The community is located south of Owatonna near the junction of Steele County Roads 3 and 45, and 68th Street.
