= Medford =

Medford may refer to:

- Medford (surname)

== Places ==
=== Canada ===
- Medford, Nova Scotia

=== United States ===
- Medford, Indiana, an unincorporated community
- Medford, Maine, a town
- Medford, Massachusetts, a city
- Medford, Minnesota, a city
- Medford, Missouri, an unincorporated community
- Medford, New Jersey, a township
- Medford Lakes, New Jersey, a borough
- Medford, New York, a hamlet and census-designated place
- Medford, Oklahoma, a city
- Medford, Oregon, a city
- Medford, Wisconsin, a city
  - Medford (town), Wisconsin, a town surrounding the city
- Medford Township (disambiguation), multiple places

== Television ==
- Medford, Texas, the fictional setting of the American television series Young Sheldon

== See also ==
- Metford, New South Wales, Australia
