= Havana, Minnesota =

Havana
- Unincorporated community
- Location within Minnesota Location within the United States
- Coordinates: 44°03′59″N 93°08′47″W
- Country: United States
- State: Minnesota
- County: Steele
- Township: Havana Township
- Elevation: 1,224 ft (373 m)
- Time zone: UTC-6 (Central (CST))
  - Summer (DST): UTC-5 (CDT)
- ZIP code: 55060
- Area code: 507
- GNIS feature ID: 644729

Havana is an unincorporated community in Havana Township, Steele County, Minnesota, United States, near Owatonna. The community is located along SE 44th Avenue near SE 18th Street.

== History ==
Havana was platted in 1867, when the Winona and St. Peter Railroad was extended to that point. The community was named after Havana, Illinois. A post office was established at Havanna in 1869, and remained in operation until 1911.
