= Richland Township, Rice County, Minnesota =

Richland Township, Minnesota
- Township
- Location within the state of Minnesota Richland Township, Minnesota (the United States)
- Coordinates: 44°14′37″N 93°5′47″W
- Country: United States
- State: Minnesota
- County: Rice

Area
  - Total: 36.1 sq mi (93.4 km^{2})
  - Land: 36.1 sq mi (93.4 km^{2})
  - Water: 0 sq mi (0.0 km^{2})
- Elevation: 1,171 ft (357 m)

Population (2000)
  - Total: 471
  - Density: 13/sq mi (5/km^{2})
- Time zone: UTC-6 (Central (CST))
  - Summer (DST): UTC-5 (CDT)
- FIPS code: 27-54250
- GNIS feature ID: 0665414

Richland Township is a township in Rice County, Minnesota, United States. The population was 471 at the 2000 census. The unincorporated communities of Moland and Ruskin are both partially located within the township. The unincorporated community of Epsom is located within Richland Township.

The first permanent settlement at Richland Township was made in 1854.

== Geography ==
According to the United States Census Bureau, the township has a total area of 36.1 square miles (93.4 km^{2}), all land.

== Demographics ==
As of the census of 2000, there were 471 people, 162 households, and 131 families residing in the township. The population density was 13.1 people per square mile (5.0/km^{2}). There were 166 housing units at an average density of 4.6/sq mi (1.8/km^{2}). The racial makeup of the township was 99.58% White, and 0.42% from two or more races. Hispanic or Latino of any race were 1.49% of the population.

There were 162 households, out of which 37.7% had children under the age of 18 living with them, 74.1% were married couples living together, 1.2% had a female householder with no husband present, and 19.1% were non-families. 16.0% of all households were made up of individuals, and 5.6% had someone living alone who was 65 years of age or older. The average household size was 2.91 and the average family size was 3.28.

In the township the population was spread out, with 28.5% under the age of 18, 6.2% from 18 to 24, 32.9% from 25 to 44, 21.4% from 45 to 64, and 11.0% who were 65 years of age or older. The median age was 37 years. For every 100 females, there were 107.5 males. For every 100 females age 18 and over, there were 116.0 males.

The median income for a household in the township was $59,911, and the median income for a family was $63,375. Males had a median income of $35,809 versus $29,250 for females. The per capita income for the township was $18,956. None of the families and 2.7% of the population were living below the poverty line, including no under eighteens and 12.0% of those over 64.
