= Deerfield Township, Steele County, Minnesota =

Deerfield Township, Minnesota
- Township
- Location within the state of Minnesota Deerfield Township, Minnesota (the United States)
- Coordinates: 44°8′18″N 93°21′6″W
- Country: United States
- State: Minnesota
- County: Steele

Area
  - Total: 35.9 sq mi (93.0 km^{2})
  - Land: 35.6 sq mi (92.2 km^{2})
  - Water: 0.31 sq mi (0.8 km^{2})
- Elevation: 1,119 ft (341 m)

Population (2000)
  - Total: 693
  - Density: 19/sq mi (7.5/km^{2})
- Time zone: UTC-6 (Central (CST))
  - Summer (DST): UTC-5 (CDT)
- ZIP code: 55049
- Area code: 507
- FIPS code: 27-15256
- GNIS feature ID: 0663944

Deerfield Township is a township in Steele County, Minnesota, United States. The population was 693 at the 2000 census.

== History ==
Deerfield Township was organized in 1858. John S. Biersdorf (1925-2009), farmer, businessman, and politician, was born in Deerfield Township.

== Geography ==
According to the United States Census Bureau, the township has a total area of 35.9 square miles (93 km^{2}), of which 35.6 square miles (92 km^{2}) is land and 0.3 square miles (0.78 km^{2}) (0.89%) is water.

== Demographics ==
As of the census of 2000, there were 693 people, 228 households, and 189 families residing in the township. The population density was 19.5 inhabitants per square mile (7.5/km^{2}). There were 233 housing units at an average density of 6.5 per square mile (2.5/km^{2}). The racial makeup of the township was 98.12% White, 0.29% Asian, 0.58% from other races, and 1.01% from two or more races. Hispanic or Latino of any race were 1.59% of the population.

There were 228 households, out of which 43.4% had children under the age of 18 living with them, 75.9% were married couples living together, 3.1% had a female householder with no husband present, and 17.1% were non-families. 14.0% of all households were made up of individuals, and 4.8% had someone living alone who was 65 years of age or older. The average household size was 3.04 and the average family size was 3.37.

In the township the population was spread out, with 32.6% under the age of 18, 8.5% from 18 to 24, 28.4% from 25 to 44, 23.1% from 45 to 64, and 7.4% who were 65 years of age or older. The median age was 33 years. For every 100 females, there were 106.3 males. For every 100 females age 18 and over, there were 108.5 males.

The median income for a household in the township was $52,727, and the median income for a family was $56,333. Males had a median income of $35,893 versus $22,917 for females. The per capita income for the township was $17,872. About 1.6% of families and 3.0% of the population were below the poverty line, including 3.8% of those under age 18 and 5.1% of those age 65 or over.
