= Daniel S. Piper House =

Historic house in Minnesota, United States

- Formerly listed on the U.S. National Register of Historic Places
- The farmstead complex in 2021

- Location within Minnesota Location within the United States
- Location: County Highway 45, Medford, Minnesota
- Coordinates: 44°10′1.3″N 93°14′47″W
- Area: Less than one acre
- Built: 1877
- Architectural style: Greek Revival/Italianate
- NRHP reference No.: 75001028

Significant dates
- Added to NRHP: February 24, 1975
- Removed from NRHP: April 13, 2026

The Daniel S. Piper House is a historic farmstead complex in Medford, Minnesota, United States. Consisting of an interconnected house, summer kitchen, shed, and barn, it is Minnesota's only known surviving example of a property type imported by settlers from New England. The Piper House complex was built in 1877. It was listed on the National Register of Historic Places in 1975 for having state-level significance in the themes of agriculture, architecture, and exploration/settlement. It was nominated for being the only surviving example of a distinctive property type and for being a symbol of Minnesota's many New Englander pioneers.

A new owner purchased the property in 2021, and asked the city to change the zoning of the property so he could demolish the buildings and build mini storage units on the site. In January 2024, the owner asked the Minnesota State Historic Preservation Office about the possibility of removing the property from the National Register, but the request was denied. The barn collapsed in mid-November of 2024. In 2025, the owner again contacted the State Historic Preservation Office asking for the structure to be removed from the National Register, citing further deterioration. The property was delisted in April 2026.

== See also ==
- National Register of Historic Places listings in Steele County, Minnesota
