= Hope, Minnesota =

Unincorporated community in Minnesota, US

Hope
- Unincorporated Community
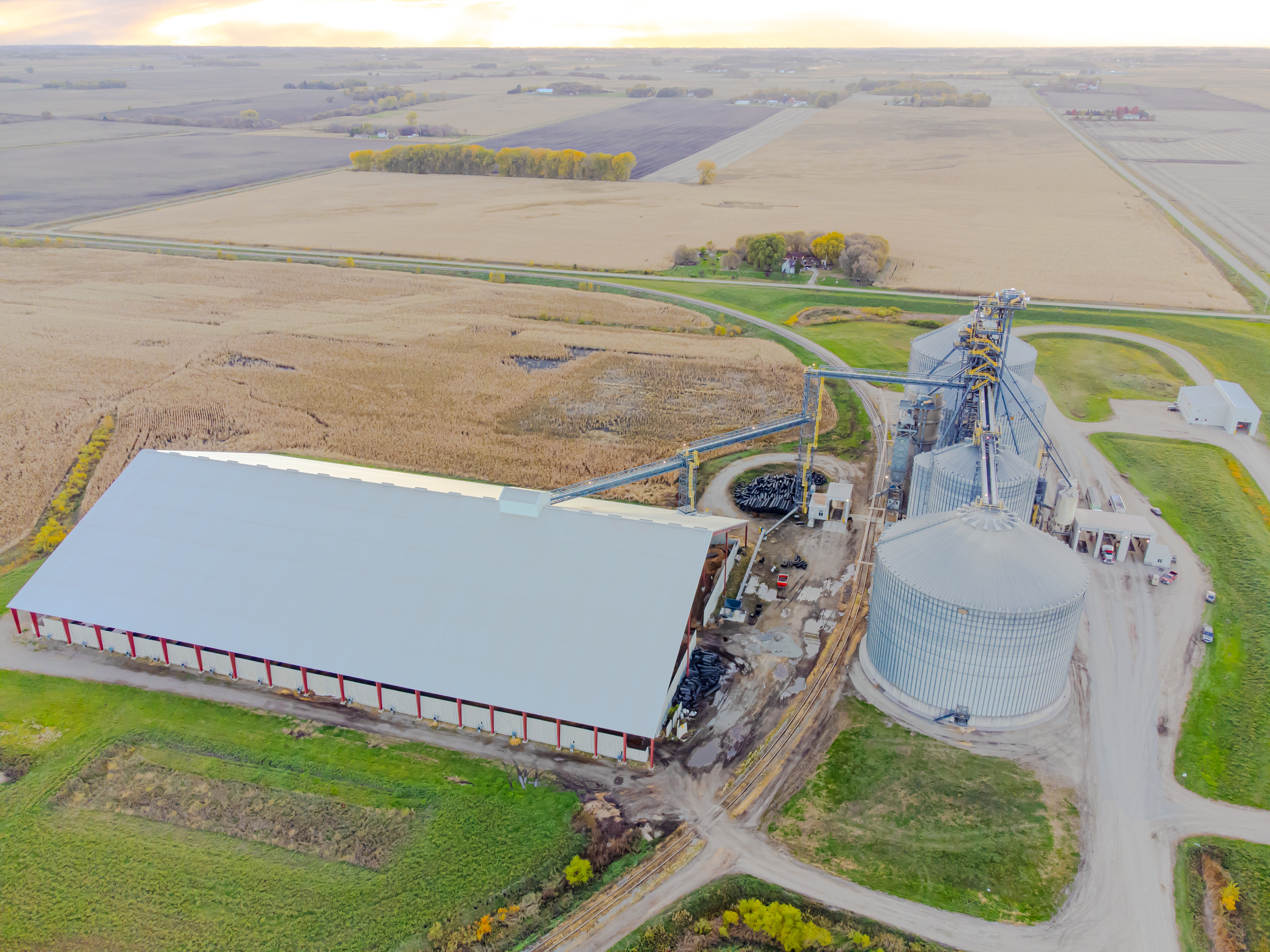
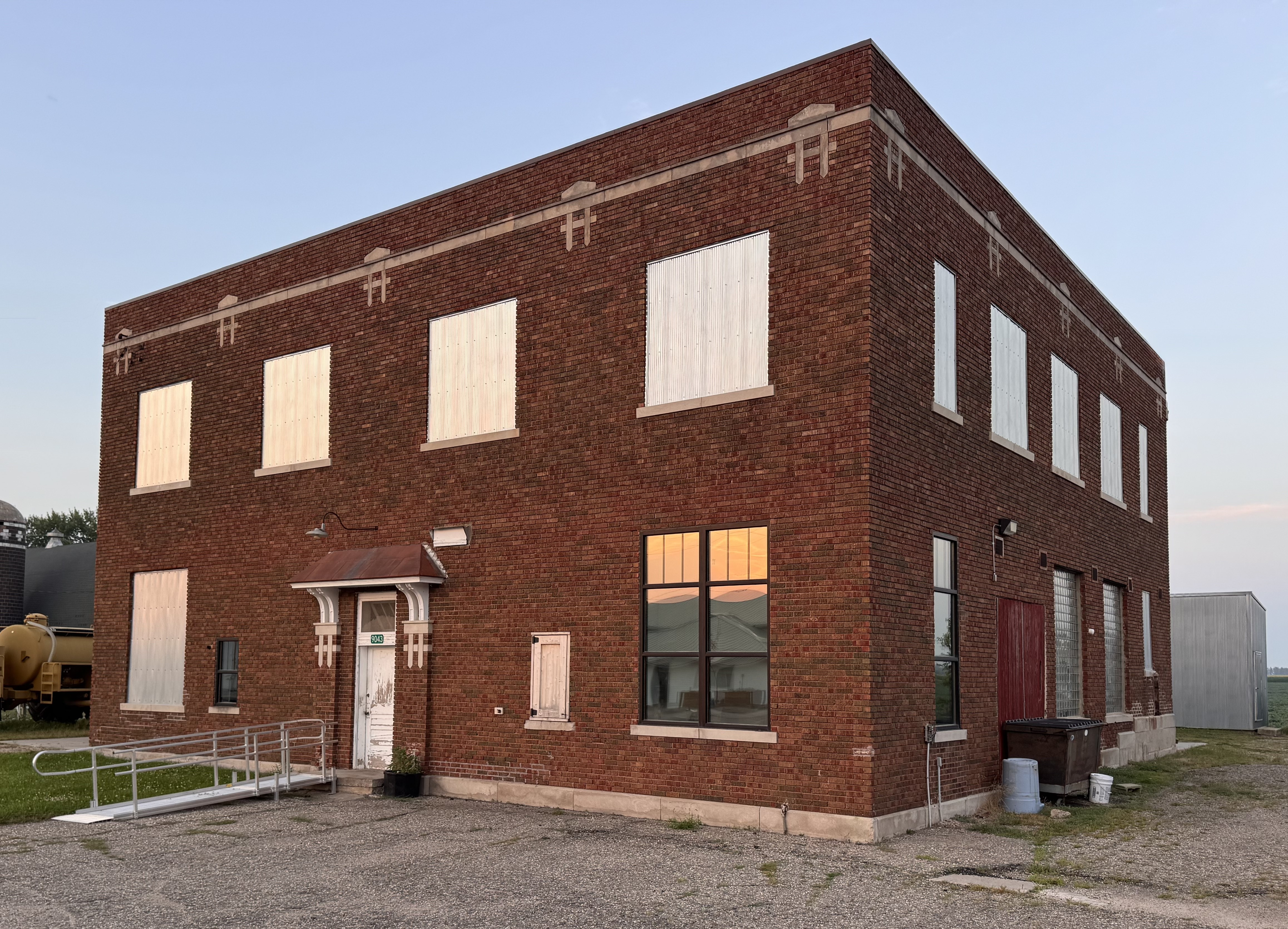
- Grain elevator in Hope Hope Creamery

- Location within Minnesota Location within the United States
- Coordinates: 43°57′43″N 93°16′34″W
- Country: United States
- State: Minnesota
- County: Steele
- Township: Somerset Township
- Elevation: 1,201 ft (366 m)
- Time zone: UTC-6 (Central (CST))
  - Summer (DST): UTC-5 (CDT)
- ZIP code: 56046
- Area code: 507
- GNIS feature ID: 645169

Hope is an unincorporated community in Somerset Township, Steele County, Minnesota, United States. Hope has a post office with ZIP code 56046.

== History ==
Hope had a depot on the Chicago, Rock Island and Pacific Railroad. A post office called Hope has been in operation since 1916.

== Geography ==
The community is located between Ellendale and Owatonna near Interstate 35 and Steele County Road 4. Nearby places include Ellendale, Owatonna, Blooming Prairie, and Bixby. Hope is seven miles north of Ellendale, and 11 miles south of Owatonna. The Straight River is nearby.

== Economy ==
Hope has a railroad grain elevator. Hope Creamery has been in operation since 1920.

== Notable people ==
- Jake Larson (1922–2025), TikToker known for his videos of his World War II experiences
