= Steele County, Minnesota =

County in Minnesota, United States

- County
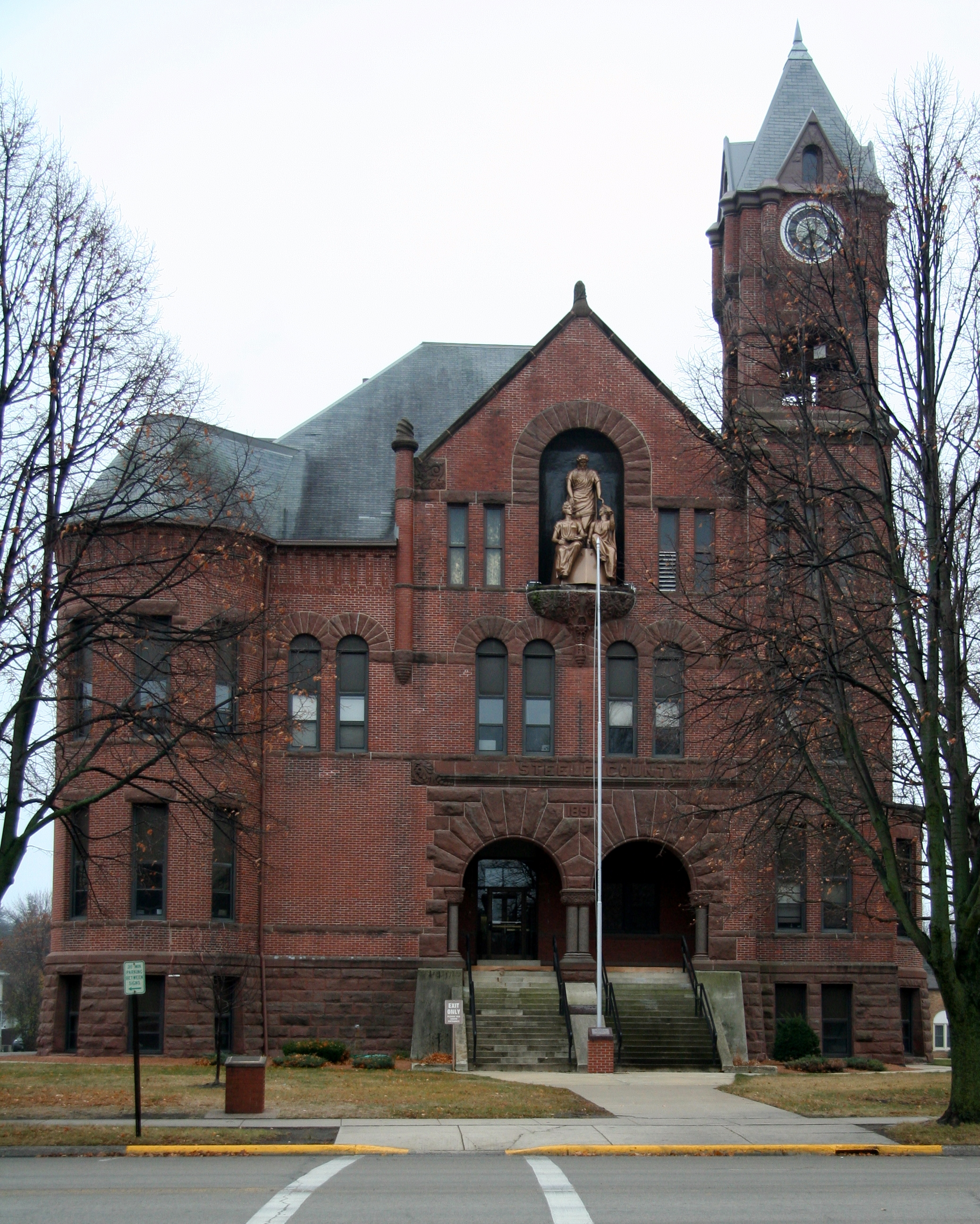
- Steele County Courthouse in Owatonna

- Location within the U.S. state of Minnesota
- Coordinates: 44°01′N 93°13′W
- Country: United States
- State: Minnesota
- Founded: February 20, 1855
- Named for: Franklin Steele
- Seat: Owatonna
- Largest city: Owatonna

Area
  - Total: 432 sq mi (1,120 km^{2})
  - Land: 430 sq mi (1,100 km^{2})
  - Water: 2.7 sq mi (7.0 km^{2}) 0.6%

Population (2020)
  - Total: 37,406
  - Estimate (2025): 37,464 ▲
  - Density: 87/sq mi (34/km^{2})
- Time zone: UTC−6 (Central)
  - Summer (DST): UTC−5 (CDT)
- Congressional district: 1st
- Website: www.steelecountymn.gov

Steele County is a county in the U.S. state of Minnesota. As of the 2020 census, the population was 37,406. Its county seat is Owatonna.

Steele County comprises the Owatonna Micropolitan Statistical Area.

== History ==
The county was created by the Minnesota Territory legislature on February 20, 1855, using areas partitioned from Rice, Blue Earth, and Le Sueur counties. Owatonna, the settlement of which had commenced in 1854, was named the county seat. The county was named for Franklin Steele, a prominent early resident of the territory.

== Geography ==
Soils of Steele County

The Straight River rises in Freeborn County and flows northward through the central part of Steele County, continuing into Rice County on the north. The South Branch of the Middle Fork of the Zumbro River rises in Steele County and flows eastward into Dodge County. The county terrain consists of low rolling hills, etched with drainages, completely devoted to agriculture where possible. The terrain slopes to the east and north, with its highest point near the midpoint of its south border, at 1,293 ft (394 m) ASL. The county has an area of 432 square miles (1,120 km^{2}), of which 430 square miles (1,100 km^{2}) are land and 2.7 square miles (7.0 km^{2}) (0.6%) are water.

The Straight River flows northward through the county, and the Le Sueur River flows through its southwestern corner. The Middle Fork of the Zumbro River rises in NE Steele County.

=== Transit ===
- Southern Minnesota Area Rural Transit

=== Major highways ===
- Interstate 35 – runs north–south through west-central portion of county. Passes Medford, Clinton Falls, Owatonna, Hope and Ellendale.
- U.S. Route 14 – runs east–west through upper central portion of county; passes Owatonna.
- U.S. Route 218 – runs north-northwest from southeast corner of county to intersection with US 14, southeast of Owatonna.
- Minnesota State Highway 30 – runs east–west across south part of county; passes Ellendale.

=== Airports ===
- Owatonna Degner Regional Airport (OWA) - northwest of Owatonna

=== Adjacent counties ===
- Rice – north
- Dodge – east
- Mower – southeast
- Freeborn – south
- Waseca – west

=== Protected areas ===
- Aurora State Wildlife Management Area
- Oak Glen State Wildlife Management Area
- Rice Lake State Park
- Somerset State Wildlife Management Area
- Swan Lake State Wildlife Management Area

=== Lakes ===
- Beaver
- Fosilen
- Kohlmeier
- Lonergan
- Oak Glen
- Rice (part)
- Rickert
- Swan

== Demographics ==
Historical population
Census	Pop.	Note	%±
1860	2,863		—
1870	8,271		188.9%
1880	12,400		49.9%
1890	13,232		6.7%
1900	16,524		24.9%
1910	16,146		−2.3%
1920	18,061		11.9%
1930	18,475		2.3%
1940	19,749		6.9%
1950	21,155		7.1%
1960	25,029		18.3%
1970	26,931		7.6%
1980	30,328		12.6%
1990	30,729		1.3%
2000	33,680		9.6%
2010	36,576		8.6%
2020	37,406		2.3%
2025 (est.)	37,464	▲	0.2%
U.S. Decennial Census; 1790-1960 1900-1990; 1990-2000 2010-2020

=== Racial and ethnic composition ===
Steele County, Minnesota – Racial and ethnic composition Note: the US Census treats Hispanic/Latino as an ethnic category. This table excludes Latinos from the racial categories and assigns them to a separate category. Hispanics/Latinos may be of any race.
Race / Ethnicity (NH = Non-Hispanic)	Pop 1980	Pop 1990	Pop 2000	Pop 2010	Pop 2020	% 1980	% 1990	% 2000	% 2010	% 2020
White alone (NH)	29,916	29,934	31,414	32,544	31,376	98.64%	97.41%	93.27%	88.98%	83.88%
Black or African American alone (NH)	13	51	357	1,003	1,359	0.04%	0.17%	1.06%	2.74%	3.63%
Native American or Alaska Native alone (NH)	26	45	30	66	65	0.09%	0.15%	0.09%	0.18%	0.17%
Asian alone (NH)	117	149	284	278	330	0.39%	0.48%	0.84%	0.76%	0.88%
Native Hawaiian or Pacific Islander alone (NH)	x	x	0	8	18	x	x	0.00%	0.02%	0.05%
Other race alone (NH)	3	6	23	18	58	0.01%	0.02%	0.07%	0.05%	0.16%
Mixed race or Multiracial (NH)	x	x	306	377	1,060	x	x	0.91%	1.03%	2.83%
Hispanic or Latino (any race)	253	544	1,266	2,282	3,140	0.83%	1.77%	3.76%	6.24%	8.39%
Total	30,328	30,729	33,680	36,576	37,406	100.00%	100.00%	100.00%	100.00%	100.00%

=== 2020 census ===
As of the 2020 census, the county had a population of 37,406. The median age was 39.9 years. 25.0% of residents were under the age of 18 and 18.2% of residents were 65 years of age or older. For every 100 females there were 99.6 males, and for every 100 females age 18 and over there were 98.5 males age 18 and over.

The racial makeup of the county was 86.0% White, 3.7% Black or African American, 0.3% American Indian and Alaska Native, 0.9% Asian, 0.1% Native Hawaiian and Pacific Islander, 3.8% from some other race, and 5.3% from two or more races. Hispanic or Latino residents of any race comprised 8.4% of the population.

70.3% of residents lived in urban areas, while 29.7% lived in rural areas.

There were 14,823 households in the county, of which 30.9% had children under the age of 18 living in them. Of all households, 52.2% were married-couple households, 17.9% were households with a male householder and no spouse or partner present, and 22.6% were households with a female householder and no spouse or partner present. About 27.8% of all households were made up of individuals and 12.3% had someone living alone who was 65 years of age or older.

There were 15,691 housing units, of which 5.5% were vacant. Among occupied housing units, 76.1% were owner-occupied and 23.9% were renter-occupied. The homeowner vacancy rate was 1.1% and the rental vacancy rate was 6.1%.

=== 2000 census ===
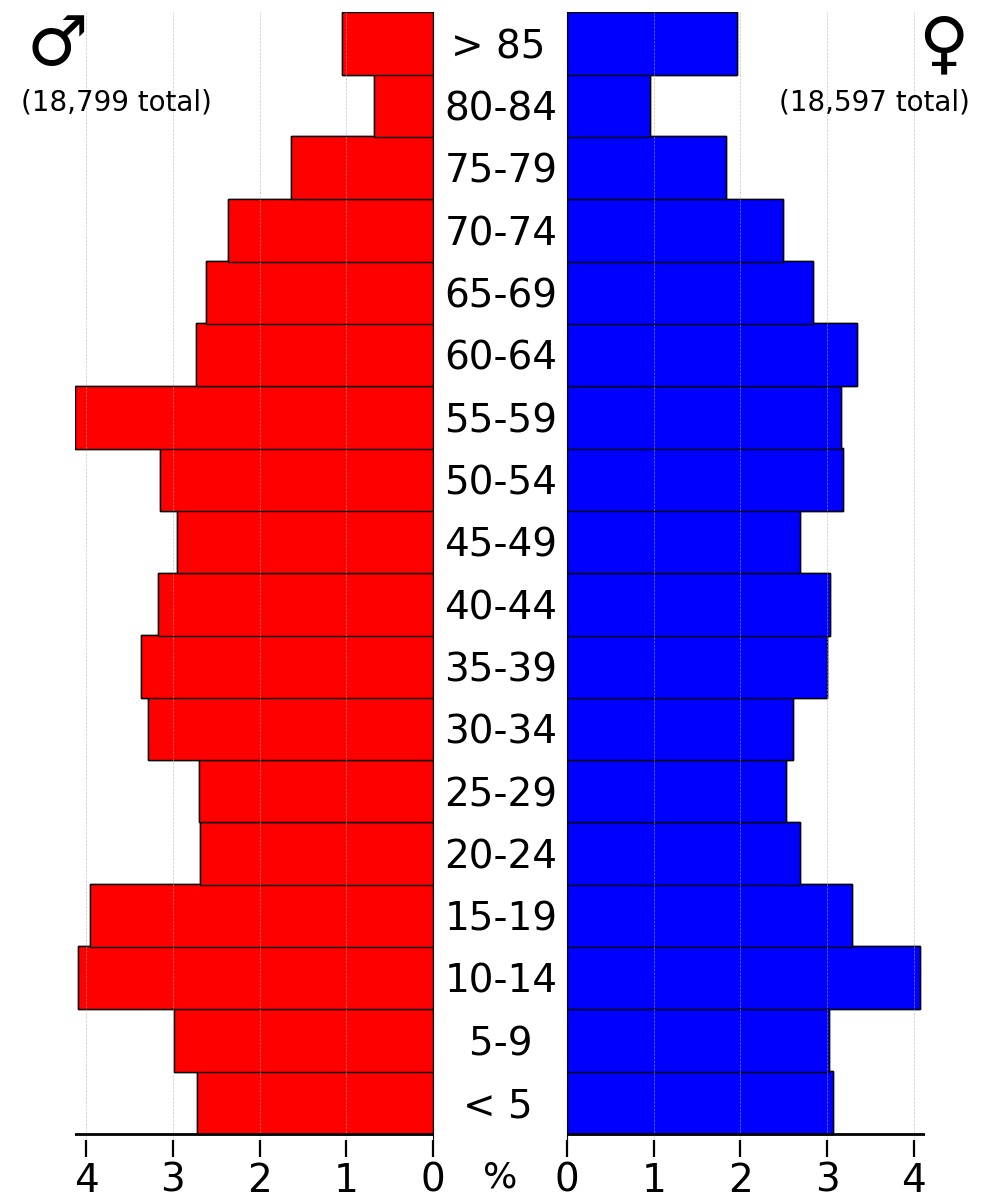
2022 US Census population pyramid for Steele County, from ACS 5-year estimates

As of the 2000 census, there were 33,680 people, 12,846 households, and 9,082 families in the county. The population density was 78.3 per square mile (30.2/km^{2}). There were 13,306 housing units at an average density of 30.9 per square mile (11.9/km^{2}). The racial makeup of the county was 95.19% White, 1.07% Black or African American, 0.10% Native American, 0.85% Asian, 0.02% Pacific Islander, 1.65% from other races, and 1.12% from two or more races. 3.76% of the population were Hispanic or Latino of any race. 38.6% were of German, 18.5% Norwegian, 5.2% Czech and 5.1% Irish ancestry.

There were 12,846 households, out of which 35.50% had children under the age of 18 living with them, 59.50% were married couples living together, 7.40% had a female householder with no husband present, and 29.30% were non-families. 24.60% of all households were made up of individuals, and 10.30% had someone living alone who was 65 years of age or older. The average household size was 2.57 and the average family size was 3.08.

The county population contained 27.90% under the age of 18, 8.20% from 18 to 24, 29.00% from 25 to 44, 21.60% from 45 to 64, and 13.30% who were 65 years of age or older. The median age was 36 years. For every 100 females, there were 97.50 males. For every 100 females age 18 and over, there were 95.00 males.

The median income for a household in the county was $46,106, and the median income for a family was $53,981. Males had a median income of $36,366 versus $25,054 for females. The per capita income for the county was $20,328. About 4.20% of families and 6.20% of the population were below the poverty line, including 7.10% of those under age 18 and 7.10% of those age 65 or over.

== Communities ==
=== Cities ===
- Blooming Prairie (partly in Dodge County)
- Ellendale
- Medford
- Owatonna (county seat)

=== Unincorporated communities ===
- Bixby
- Clinton Falls
- Deerfield
- Havana
- Hope
- Lemond
- Litomysl
- Meriden
- Merton
- Moland
- Pratt
- Saco
- Steele Center

=== Ghost town ===
- Rice Lake

=== Townships ===
- Aurora
- Berlin
- Blooming Prairie
- Clinton Falls
- Deerfield
- Havana
- Lemond
- Medford
- Meriden
- Merton
- Owatonna
- Somerset
- Summit

== Politics ==
Steele County voters have traditionally voted Republican. In only one national election since 1964 has the county selected the Democratic Party candidate (as of 2024).

State Legislature (2021-2023)
Position	Name	Affiliation	District
Senate	John Jasinski	Republican	District 24
Senate	Gene Dornink	Republican	District 27
House of Representatives	John Petersburg	Republican	District 24A
House of Representatives	Brian Daniels	Republican	District 24A

U.S Congress (2021-2023)
Position	Name	Affiliation	District
House of Representatives	Brad Finstad	Republican	1st
Senate	Amy Klobuchar	Democrat	
Senate	Tina Smith	Democrat	

United States presidential election results for Steele County, Minnesota
Year	Republican		Democratic		Third party(ies)	
Year	No.	%	No.	%	No.	%
1892	1,396	48.71%	1,299	45.32%	171	5.97%
1896	2,046	59.41%	1,248	36.24%	150	4.36%
1900	1,833	58.32%	1,188	37.80%	122	3.88%
1904	2,095	63.43%	1,067	32.30%	141	4.27%
1908	1,899	57.11%	1,284	38.62%	142	4.27%
1912	651	20.34%	1,294	40.44%	1,255	39.22%
1916	1,734	52.20%	1,497	45.06%	91	2.74%
1920	4,243	76.45%	1,167	21.03%	140	2.52%
1924	3,598	59.50%	796	13.16%	1,653	27.34%
1928	4,744	62.46%	2,826	37.21%	25	0.33%
1932	3,365	43.20%	4,318	55.43%	107	1.37%
1936	3,373	41.01%	4,481	54.49%	370	4.50%
1940	5,517	59.97%	3,668	39.87%	14	0.15%
1944	4,760	58.90%	3,307	40.92%	15	0.19%
1948	4,451	50.49%	4,305	48.83%	60	0.68%
1952	6,956	70.95%	2,819	28.75%	29	0.30%
1956	6,435	65.91%	3,293	33.73%	36	0.37%
1960	6,795	60.13%	4,491	39.74%	15	0.13%
1964	4,882	44.63%	6,022	55.05%	35	0.32%
1968	6,193	55.34%	4,631	41.39%	366	3.27%
1972	7,678	64.69%	4,010	33.79%	180	1.52%
1976	7,053	51.68%	6,263	45.89%	331	2.43%
1980	7,805	54.66%	5,095	35.68%	1,379	9.66%
1984	8,780	63.12%	5,060	36.38%	70	0.50%
1988	7,981	58.64%	5,496	40.38%	133	0.98%
1992	5,964	37.77%	5,152	32.63%	4,673	29.60%
1996	5,617	37.54%	6,974	46.61%	2,373	15.86%
2000	8,223	51.18%	6,900	42.95%	943	5.87%
2004	10,389	55.57%	7,994	42.76%	312	1.67%
2008	10,068	51.22%	9,016	45.87%	572	2.91%
2012	9,903	51.78%	8,706	45.52%	515	2.69%
2016	11,198	58.39%	6,241	32.54%	1,740	9.07%
2020	12,656	59.90%	7,917	37.47%	555	2.63%
2024	12,742	61.05%	7,650	36.65%	480	2.30%

== See also ==
- National Register of Historic Places listings in Steele County, Minnesota
