= Moland, Minnesota =

Moland
- Unincorporated community
- Location within Minnesota Location within the United States
- Coordinates: 44°11′48″N 93°03′42″W
- Country: United States
- State: Minnesota
- County: Rice and Steele
- Township: Richland Township and Merton Township
- Elevation: 1,260 ft (380 m)
- Time zone: UTC-6 (Central (CST))
  - Summer (DST): UTC-5 (CDT)
- ZIP code: 55946
- Area code: 507
- GNIS feature ID: 654835

Moland is an unincorporated community in Rice and Steele counties in the U.S. state of Minnesota.

The center of Moland is generally considered near the intersection of Lamb Avenue and 270th Street E / NE 86th Street.

Moland is located within Richland Township in Rice County; and also located within Merton Township in Steele County.

From 1882 to 1905, the community had a post office.

Portions of the community used to extend into Goodhue and Dodge counties. Nearby places include Kenyon and Medford.
