= Jake Larson =

American World War II veteran and TikToker (1922–2025)

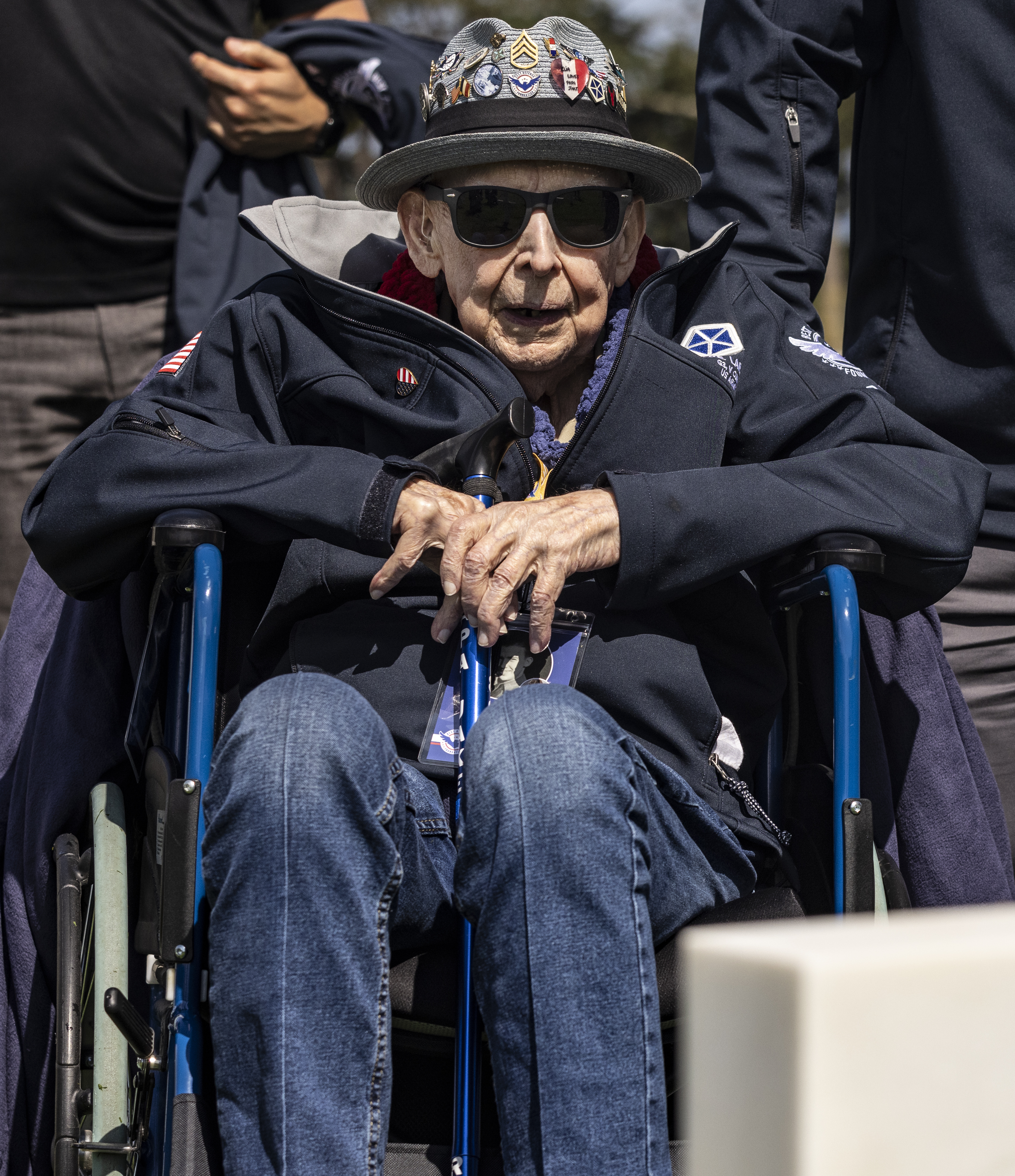
- Larson in 2025
- Born: Jake Melvin Larson; December 20, 1922; Hope, Minnesota, U.S.
- Died: July 17, 2025 (aged 102); Lafayette, California, U.S.
- Occupation: TikToker
- Spouse: Lola Cassem (m. 1945; died. 1991)

TikTok information
- Page: Papa Jake
- Years active: 2020–2025
- Followers: 1.2 million
- Military career
- Allegiance: United States
- Branch: Minnesota National Guard; United States Army
- Service years: 1938–1945
- Rank: Staff sergeant
- Units: 135th Infantry Regiment, 34th Infantry Division
- Conflicts: World War II: Operation Overlord
- Awards: Bronze Star Medal; Legion of Honor

Jake Melvin Larson (December 20, 1922 – July 17, 2025), also known as Papa Jake, was an American World War II veteran and TikToker. He was best known for sharing stories about his experiences of World War II on TikTok.

== Early life and career ==
Larson was born in Hope, Minnesota, the son of Fred Larson, a farmer, and Margaret Peterson. He joined the Minnesota National Guard in 1938. He served with the 135th Infantry Regiment in the 34th Infantry Division in the United States Army during World War II. During his military service, he held the rank of staff sergeant, and fought at Omaha Beach and the Battle of the Bulge, and was an operations sergeant who was involved in the planning of Operation Overlord. He was discharged from his military service in 1945. For his military service, he was awarded the Bronze Star Medal and the Legion of Honor.

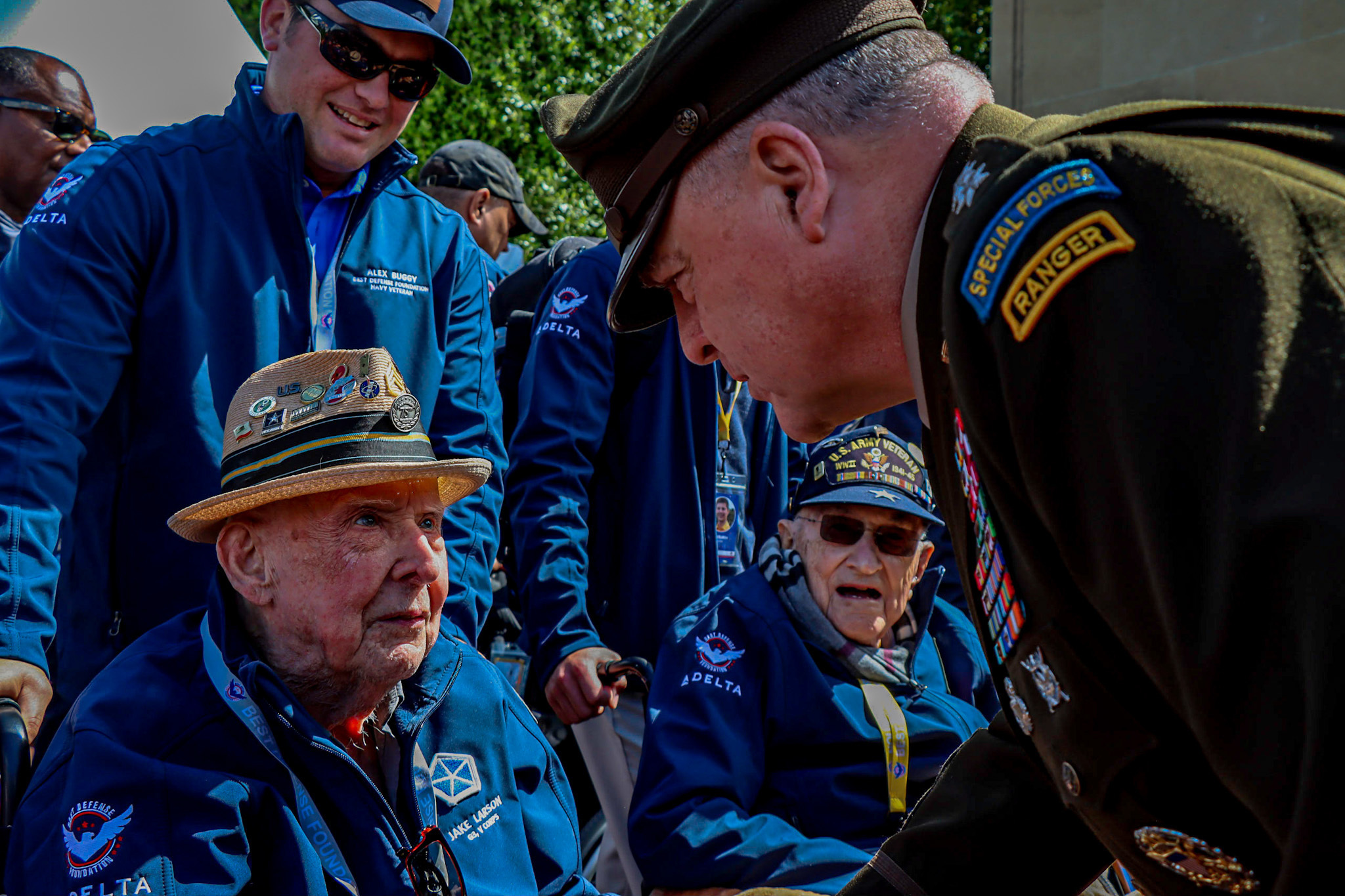
Larson (bottom left) with Mark Milley, 2022

Larson's granddaughter created his TikTok account in June 2020. His account went viral after his granddaughter posted a video about Larson's military service. After gaining popularity on TikTok, in 2021, he wrote his memoir The Luckiest Man in the World: Stories from the Life of Papa Jake.

In June 2025, Larson won a News and Documentary News Emmy Award in the category Outstanding Live Interview. His win was shared with Christiane Amanpour.

== Personal life and death ==
In 1945, Larson married Lola Cassem. Their marriage lasted until her death in 1991.

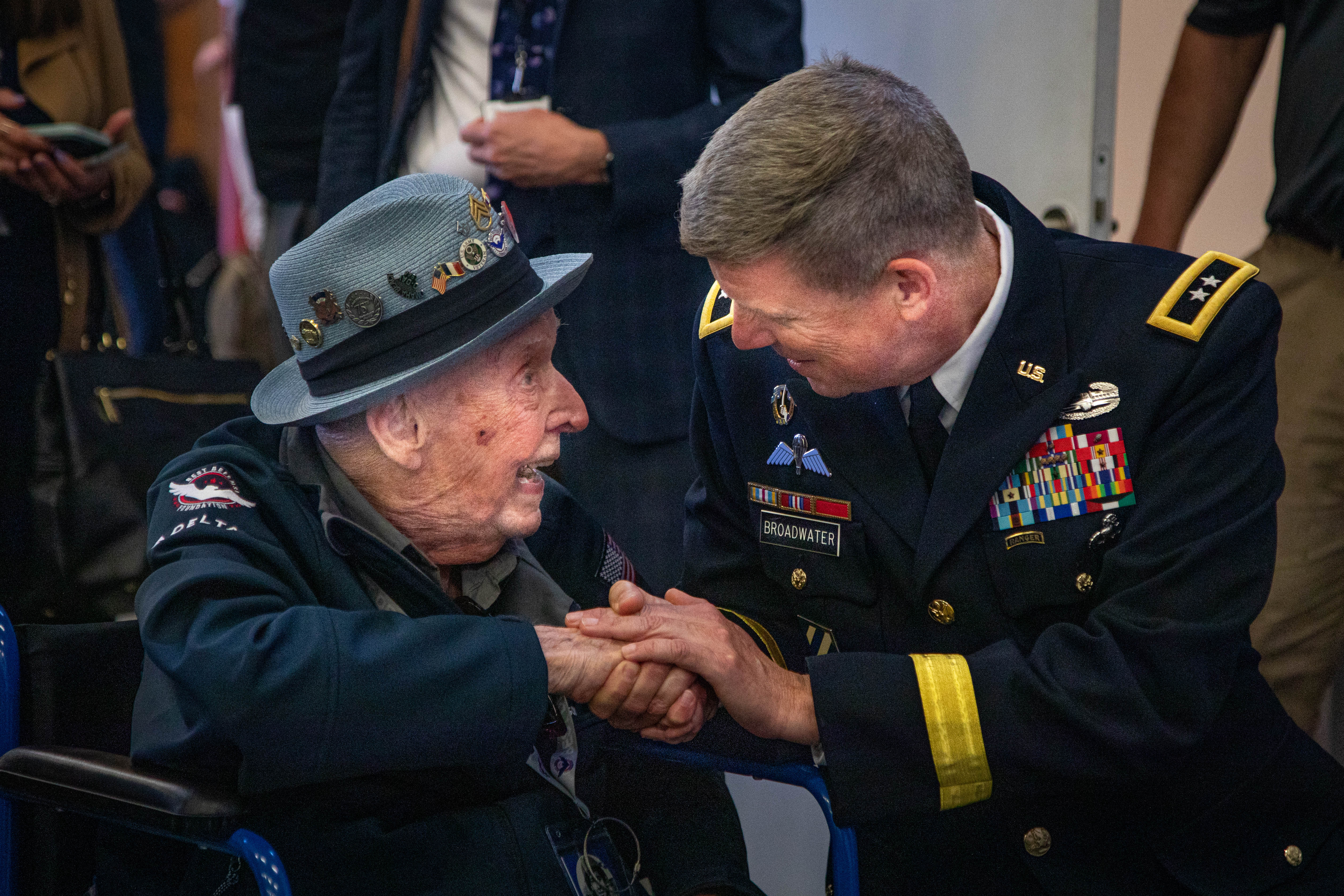
Larson (left) with Jeffery Broadwater, 2023

On December 20, 2022, Larson turned 100. He died at his home in Lafayette, California, on July 17, 2025, at the age of 102. At the time of his death, he was the last surviving member of the army's 135th Infantry Regiment.
