= Medford (surname) =

Medford is an ancient Saxony surname, found in Northumberland (North East England) and may refer to

- Don Medford, television director.
- Hernan Medford, professional soccer player.
- Kay Medford, actress.
- Paul J. Medford, actor.

== See also ==
- Medford (disambiguation)
