= Marion Lake (Dakota County, Minnesota) =

Lake in the state of Minnesota, United States

- Location within Minnesota
- Location: Dakota County, Minnesota
- Coordinates: 44°39′56″N 93°16′57″W
- Type: lake

Marion Lake is a lake in Dakota County, in the U.S. state of Minnesota.

Marion Lake was named by Marion W. Savage, proprietor of the Dan Patch Air Rail and owner of the famous race horse Dan Patch. This was also the site of Antler's Park, an amusement park for swimming, dancing and picnics. The park was created as the last destination of the Dan Patch Air Rail.

== See also ==
- List of lakes in Minnesota
- Dan Patch
