= Medford Township, Steele County, Minnesota =

Medford Township, Minnesota
- Township
- Location within the state of Minnesota Medford Township, Minnesota (the United States)
- Coordinates: 44°10′39″N 93°14′26″W
- Country: United States
- State: Minnesota
- County: Steele

Area
  - Total: 17.1 sq mi (44.4 km^{2})
  - Land: 17.1 sq mi (44.2 km^{2})
  - Water: 0.077 sq mi (0.2 km^{2})
- Elevation: 1,089 ft (332 m)

Population (2000)
  - Total: 681
  - Density: 40/sq mi (15.4/km^{2})
- Time zone: UTC-6 (Central (CST))
  - Summer (DST): UTC-5 (CDT)
- ZIP code: 55049
- Area code: 507
- FIPS code: 27-41444
- GNIS feature ID: 0664947

Medford Township is a township in Steele County, Minnesota, United States. The population was 681 at the 2000 census.

Medford Township was organized in 1855, and named for Medford Colling, the son of an early settler.

== Geography ==
According to the United States Census Bureau, the township has a total area of 17.1 square miles (44.4 km^{2}), of which 17.1 square miles (44.2 km^{2}) is land and 0.1 square mile (0.2 km^{2}) (0.35%) is water.

== Demographics ==
As of the census of 2000, there were 681 people, 258 households, and 189 families residing in the township. The population density was 39.9 inhabitants per square mile (15.4/km^{2}). There were 261 housing units at an average density of 15.3 per square mile (5.9/km^{2}). The racial makeup of the township was 97.50% White, 0.15% African American, 0.15% Native American, 0.15% Asian, 0.88% from other races, and 1.17% from two or more races. Hispanic or Latino of any race were 2.35% of the population.

There were 258 households, out of which 38.4% had children under the age of 18 living with them, 60.1% were married couples living together, 8.5% had a female householder with no husband present, and 26.7% were non-families. 20.9% of all households were made up of individuals, and 7.4% had someone living alone who was 65 years of age or older. The average household size was 2.64 and the average family size was 3.06.

In the township the population was spread out, with 29.8% under the age of 18, 9.0% from 18 to 24, 33.9% from 25 to 44, 17.6% from 45 to 64, and 9.7% who were 65 years of age or older. The median age was 32 years. For every 100 females, there were 104.5 males. For every 100 females age 18 and over, there were 99.2 males.

The median income for a household in the township was $39,000, and the median income for a family was $40,000. Males had a median income of $31,944 versus $20,714 for females. The per capita income for the township was $19,890. About 4.1% of families and 4.2% of the population were below the poverty line, including 5.6% of those under age 18 and 2.8% of those age 65 or over.
