= Lake Kohlmeier =

- Location within Minnesota Location within the United States
- Location: Owatonna, Minnesota, United States
- Coordinates: 44.0690°N 93.2444°W
- Type: Artificial lake
- Basin countries: United States

Lake Kohlmeier is a large artificial pond in Owatonna, Minnesota. It was created in an abandoned gravel mine using the natural flooding of springwater. The lake is named after the former owner of the property and operator of the aggregate business once operated there. The lake once hosted the municipal beach and continues to be used for swimming, fishing, and boating.
