= Merton Township, Steele County, Minnesota =

Merton Township, Minnesota
- Township
- Location within the state of Minnesota Merton Township, Minnesota (the United States)
- Coordinates: 44°9′25″N 93°6′12″W
- Country: United States
- State: Minnesota
- County: Steele

Area
  - Total: 35.9 sq mi (93.0 km^{2})
  - Land: 35.8 sq mi (92.7 km^{2})
  - Water: 0.12 sq mi (0.3 km^{2})
- Elevation: 1,257 ft (383 m)

Population (2000)
  - Total: 380
  - Density: 11/sq mi (4.1/km^{2})
- Time zone: UTC-6 (Central (CST))
  - Summer (DST): UTC-5 (CDT)
- FIPS code: 27-41840
- GNIS feature ID: 0664961

Merton Township is a township in Steele County, Minnesota, United States. The population was 380 at the 2000 census. The unincorporated community of Merton is located within the township. The unincorporated community of Moland is partially located within the township.

== History ==
Merton Township was originally called Orion Township, and under the latter name was organized in 1858. The name was changed to Merton Township in 1862.

== Geography ==
According to the United States Census Bureau, the township has a total area of 35.9 square miles (93 km^{2}), of which 35.8 square miles (93 km^{2}) is land and 0.1 square miles (0.26 km^{2}) (0.28%) is water.

== Demographics ==
As of the census of 2000, there were 380 people, 140 households, and 110 families residing in the township. The population density was 10.6 people per square mile (4.1 people/km^{2}). There were 159 housing units at an average density of 4.4 per square mile (1.7/km^{2}). The racial makeup of the township was 95.00% White, 0.26% African American, 1.32% from other races, and 3.42% from two or more races. Hispanic or Latino of any race were 5.26% of the population.

There were 140 households, out of which 32.1% had children under the age of 18 living with them, 67.9% were married couples living together, 2.9% had a female householder with no husband present, and 21.4% were non-families. 17.9% of all households were made up of individuals, and 7.1% had someone living alone who was 65 years of age or older. The average household size was 2.71 and the average family size was 3.09.

In the township the population was spread out, with 26.6% under the age of 18, 6.1% from 18 to 24, 28.4% from 25 to 44, 22.4% from 45 to 64, and 16.6% who were 65 years of age or older. The median age was 38 years. For every 100 females, there were 109.9 males. For every 100 females age 18 and over, there were 114.6 males.

The median income for a household in the township was $52,875, and the median income for a family was $55,250. Males had a median income of $32,375 versus $23,125 for females. The per capita income for the township was $21,321. About 1.0% of families and 2.7% of the population were below the poverty line, including 3.9% of those under age 18 and 1.6% of those age 65 or over.
