= Ruskin, Minnesota =

Ruskin
- Unincorporated community
- Location within Minnesota Location within the United States
- Coordinates: 44°16′03″N 93°09′43″W
- Country: United States
- State: Minnesota
- County: Rice County
- Township: Richland Township and Walcott Township
- Elevation: 1,142 ft (348 m)
- Time zone: UTC-6 (Central (CST))
  - Summer (DST): UTC-5 (CDT)
- ZIP code: 55021
- Area code: 507
- GNIS feature ID: 654920

Ruskin is an unincorporated community in Rice County, Minnesota, United States.

The community is located at the junction of Rice County Road 23 (Gates Avenue) and 220th Street East.

State Highway 60 (MN 60) is nearby. Ruskin is located within Richland Township and Walcott Township.

A school, the Ruskin School, is located near the center of the community.
