= Bixby, Minnesota =

Bixby
- Unincorporated community
- Location within Minnesota Location within the United States
- Coordinates: 43°56′40″N 93°05′50″W
- Country: United States
- State: Minnesota
- County: Steele
- Township: Aurora Township
- Elevation: 1,302 ft (397 m)
- Time zone: UTC-6 (Central (CST))
  - Summer (DST): UTC-5 (CDT)
- ZIP code: 55917
- Area code: 507
- GNIS feature ID: 654606

Bixby is an unincorporated community in Aurora Township, Steele County, Minnesota, United States.

== Geography ==
Bixby is located between Blooming Prairie and Owatonna along U.S. Highway 218 near its intersection with Steele County Road 4.

Nearby places include Blooming Prairie, Owatonna, Hope, Claremont, and Oak Glen Lake. County Roads 16 and 26 are also in the immediate area.

== History ==
Bixby was laid out in about 1890. The community is named in honor of John Bixby (1814–1890), a pioneer who settled near the town site. A post office was established at Bixby in 1889, and remained in operation until 1982.
