= Blooming Prairie Township, Steele County, Minnesota =

Blooming Prairie Township, Minnesota
- Township
- Location within the state of Minnesota Blooming Prairie Township, Minnesota (the United States)
- Coordinates: 43°53′45″N 93°5′44″W
- Country: United States
- State: Minnesota
- County: Steele

Area
  - Total: 35.0 sq mi (90.6 km^{2})
  - Land: 34.4 sq mi (89.2 km^{2})
  - Water: 0.54 sq mi (1.4 km^{2})
- Elevation: 1,250 ft (381 m)

Population (2000)
  - Total: 519
  - Density: 15/sq mi (5.8/km^{2})
- Time zone: UTC-6 (Central (CST))
  - Summer (DST): UTC-5 (CDT)
- ZIP code: 55917
- Area code: 507
- FIPS code: 27-06598
- GNIS feature ID: 0663620

Blooming Prairie Township is a township in Steele County, Minnesota, United States.

== Demographics ==
The population was 397 at the 2000 census. Total household is 150. Employment rate is 65.2%, with 24.5% having Bachelor Degree or higher level of education.

== History ==
Blooming Prairie Township was originally called Oak Glen Township, and under the latter name was organized in 1867. The name was changed to Blooming Prairie in 1873.

== Geography ==
According to the United States Census Bureau, the township has a total area of 35.0 square miles (91 km^{2}), of which 34.5 square miles (89 km^{2}) is land and 0.5 square miles (1.3 km^{2}) (1.49%) is water.

== Demographics ==
As of the census of 2000, there were 519 people, 177 households, and 138 families residing in the township. The population density was 15.1 inhabitants per square mile (5.8/km^{2}). There were 183 housing units at an average density of 5.3 per square mile (2.0/km^{2}). The racial makeup of the township was 97.11% White, 0.19% African American, 2.12% Asian, 0.39% from other races, and 0.19% from two or more races. Hispanic or Latino of any race were 1.35% of the population.

There were 177 households, out of which 45.2% had children under the age of 18 living with them, 69.5% were married couples living together, 4.0% had a female householder with no husband present, and 22.0% were non-families. 19.2% of all households were made up of individuals, and 10.2% had someone living alone who was 65 years of age or older. The average household size was 2.93 and the average family size was 3.40.

In the township the population was spread out, with 33.1% under the age of 18, 6.6% from 18 to 24, 29.5% from 25 to 44, 19.7% from 45 to 64, and 11.2% who were 65 years of age or older. The median age was 34 years. For every 100 females, there were 104.3 males. For every 100 females age 18 and over, there were 111.6 males.

The median income for a household in the township was $45,625, and the median income for a family was $46,500. Males had a median income of $34,375 versus $24,219 for females. The per capita income for the township was $18,189. About 9.2% of families and 8.6% of the population were below the poverty line, including 5.0% of those under age 18 and 15.8% of those age 65 or over.
