= Summit Township, Steele County, Minnesota =

Summit Township, Minnesota
- Township
- Location within the state of Minnesota Summit Township, Minnesota (the United States)
- Coordinates: 43°54′12″N 93°13′5″W
- Country: United States
- State: Minnesota
- County: Steele

Area
  - Total: 35.9 sq mi (93.1 km^{2})
  - Land: 35.9 sq mi (93.0 km^{2})
  - Water: 0.039 sq mi (0.1 km^{2})
- Elevation: 1,180 ft (360 m)

Population (2000)
  - Total: 515
  - Density: 14/sq mi (5.5/km^{2})
- Time zone: UTC-6 (Central (CST))
  - Summer (DST): UTC-5 (CDT)
- ZIP code: 55917
- Area code: 507
- FIPS code: 27-63364
- GNIS feature ID: 0665736

Summit Township is a township in Steele County, Minnesota, United States. The population was 515 at the 2000 census.

Summit Township was organized in 1858, and named for a relatively high point of elevation atop a drainage divide.

== Geography ==
According to the United States Census Bureau, the township has a total area of 36.0 square miles (93.1 km^{2}), of which 35.9 square miles (93.0 km^{2}) is land and 0.04 square mile (0.1 km^{2}) (0.08%) is water.

== Demographics ==
As of the census of 2000, there were 515 people, 175 households, and 145 families residing in the township. The population density was 14.3 people per square mile (5.5/km^{2}). There were 180 housing units at an average density of 5.0/sq mi (1.9/km^{2}). The racial makeup of the township was 99.61% White, 0.19% Asian, and 0.19% from two or more races.

There were 175 households, out of which 40.0% had children under the age of 18 living with them, 74.3% were married couples living together, 6.3% had a female householder with no husband present, and 16.6% were non-families. 14.3% of all households were made up of individuals, and 5.7% had someone living alone who was 65 years of age or older. The average household size was 2.94 and the average family size was 3.25.

In the township the population was spread out, with 30.5% under the age of 18, 6.2% from 18 to 24, 26.6% from 25 to 44, 24.3% from 45 to 64, and 12.4% who were 65 years of age or older. The median age was 37 years. For every 100 females, there were 103.6 males. For every 100 females age 18 and over, there were 108.1 males.

The median income for a household in the township was $38,958, and the median income for a family was $39,896. Males had a median income of $29,063 versus $23,375 for females. The per capita income for the township was $14,977. About 8.8% of families and 9.3% of the population were below the poverty line, including 11.3% of those under age 18 and 18.6% of those age 65 or over.
