= Lemond Township, Steele County, Minnesota =

Lemond Township, Minnesota
- Township
- Location within the state of Minnesota Lemond Township, Minnesota (the United States)
- Coordinates: 43°58′37″N 93°20′34″W
- Country: United States
- State: Minnesota
- County: Steele

Area
  - Total: 36.1 sq mi (93.4 km^{2})
  - Land: 36.0 sq mi (93.3 km^{2})
  - Water: 0.039 sq mi (0.1 km^{2})
- Elevation: 1,204 ft (367 m)

Population (2000)
  - Total: 510
  - Density: 14/sq mi (5.5/km^{2})
- Time zone: UTC-6 (Central (CST))
  - Summer (DST): UTC-5 (CDT)
- FIPS code: 27-36386
- GNIS feature ID: 0664751

Lemond Township is a township in Steele County, Minnesota, United States. The population was 510 at the 2000 census.

Lemond Township was organized in 1858.

== Geography ==
According to the United States Census Bureau, the township has a total area of 36.0 square miles (93 km^{2}), of which 36.0 square miles (93 km^{2}) is land and 0.04 square miles (0.10 km^{2}) (0.08%) is water.

== Demographics ==
As of the census of 2000, there were 510 people, 185 households, and 145 families residing in the township. The population density was 14.2 people per square mile (5.5 people/km^{2}). There were 192 housing units at an average density of 5.3 per square mile (2.0/km^{2}). The racial makeup of the township was 98.43% White, 0.39% Asian, 0.39% from other races, and 0.78% from two or more races. Hispanic or Latino of any race were 0.78% of the population.

There were 185 households, out of which 34.1% had children under the age of 18 living with them, 73.0% were married couples living together, 2.2% had a female householder with no husband present, and 21.1% were non-families. 17.3% of all households were made up of individuals, and 5.9% had someone living alone who was 65 years of age or older. The average household size was 2.76 and the average family size was 3.10.

In the township the population was spread out, with 25.7% under the age of 18, 7.8% from 18 to 24, 25.7% from 25 to 44, 28.0% from 45 to 64, and 12.7% who were 65 years of age or older. The median age was 38 years. For every 100 females, there were 113.4 males. For every 100 females age 18 and over, there were 124.3 males.

The median income for a household in the township was $47,708, and the median income for a family was $50,000. Males had a median income of $36,042 versus $25,750 for females. The per capita income for the township was $20,188. About 4.7% of families and 5.8% of the population were below the poverty line, including 13.4% of those under age 18 and none of those age 65 or over.
