= Aurora Township, Steele County, Minnesota =

Aurora Township, Minnesota
- Township
- Location within the state of Minnesota Aurora Township, Minnesota (the United States)
- Coordinates: 43°58′24″N 93°6′32″W
- Country: United States
- State: Minnesota
- County: Steele

Area
  - Total: 36.0 sq mi (93.2 km^{2})
  - Land: 35.9 sq mi (93.1 km^{2})
  - Water: 0.039 sq mi (0.1 km^{2})
- Elevation: 1,302 ft (397 m)

Population (2000)
  - Total: 625
  - Density: 17/sq mi (6.7/km^{2})
- Time zone: UTC-6 (Central (CST))
  - Summer (DST): UTC-5 (CDT)
- FIPS code: 27-02890
- GNIS feature ID: 0663481

Aurora Township is a township in Steele County, Minnesota, United States. The population was 625 at the 2000 census.

Aurora Township was organized in 1857, and named after Aurora, Illinois.

== Geography ==
According to the United States Census Bureau, the township has a total area of 36.0 square miles (93 km^{2}), of which 36.0 square miles (93 km^{2}) is land and 0.04 square miles (0.10 km^{2}) (0.08%) is water.

== Demographics ==
As of the census of 2000, there were 625 people, 217 households, and 177 families residing in the township. The population density was 17.4 inhabitants per square mile (6.7/km^{2}). There were 229 housing units at an average density of 6.4 per square mile (2.5/km^{2}). The racial makeup of the township was 99.84% White and 0.16% African American. Hispanic or Latino of any race were 0.32% of the population.

There were 217 households, out of which 39.2% had children under the age of 18 living with them, 72.4% were married couples living together, 2.8% had a female householder with no husband present, and 18.4% were non-families. 14.7% of all households were made up of individuals, and 7.8% had someone living alone who was 65 years of age or older. The average household size was 2.88 and the average family size was 3.20.

In the township the population was spread out, with 29.0% under the age of 18, 8.2% from 18 to 24, 27.4% from 25 to 44, 23.0% from 45 to 64, and 12.5% who were 65 years of age or older. The median age was 36 years. For every 100 females, there were 109.0 males. For every 100 females age 18 and over, there were 118.7 males.

The median income for a household in the township was $45,804, and the median income for a family was $50,625. Males had a median income of $31,750 versus $24,423 for females. The per capita income for the township was $17,192. About 4.9% of families and 5.1% of the population were below the poverty line, including 4.0% of those under age 18 and 4.8% of those age 65 or over.
