= Havana Township, Steele County, Minnesota =

Havana Township, Minnesota
- Township
- Location within the state of Minnesota Havana Township, Minnesota (the United States)
- Coordinates: 44°4′14″N 93°6′52″W
- Country: United States
- State: Minnesota
- County: Steele

Area
  - Total: 36.0 sq mi (93.2 km^{2})
  - Land: 35.0 sq mi (90.7 km^{2})
  - Water: 1.0 sq mi (2.6 km^{2})
- Elevation: 1,270 ft (387 m)

Population (2000)
  - Total: 607
  - Density: 17/sq mi (6.7/km^{2})
- Time zone: UTC-6 (Central (CST))
  - Summer (DST): UTC-5 (CDT)
- ZIP code: 55060
- Area code: 507
- FIPS code: 27-27638
- GNIS feature ID: 0664414

Havana Township is a township in Steele County, Minnesota, United States. The population was 607 at the 2000 census.

== History ==
Havana Township was originally called Lafayette Township, and under the latter name was organized in 1857. Its name was soon changed to Freeman Township, then Dover Township, until it was finally renamed Havana Township in 1869. The present name is after Havana, Illinois.

== Geography ==
According to the United States Census Bureau, the township has a total area of 36.0 square miles (93 km^{2}); 35.0 square miles (91 km^{2}) is land and 1.0 square mile (2.6 km^{2}) (2.75%) is water.

== Demographics ==
At the 2000 census, there were 607 people, 224 households and 176 families residing in the township. The population density was 17.3 per square mile (6.7/km^{2}). There were 229 housing units at an average density of 6.5/sq mi (2.5/km^{2}). The racial makeup of the township was 99.18% White, and 0.82% from two or more races. Hispanic or Latino of any race were 0.66% of the population.

There were 224 households, of which 37.9% had children under the age of 18 living with them, 68.8% were married couples living together, 4.9% had a female householder with no husband present, and 21.0% were non-families. 17.4% of all households were made up of individuals, and 10.3% had someone living alone who was 65 years of age or older. The average household size was 2.71 and the average family size was 3.06.

Age distribution was 28.2% under the age of 18, 6.4% from 18 to 24, 24.7% from 25 to 44, 27.7% from 45 to 64, and 13.0% who were 65 years of age or older. The median age was 40 years. For every 100 females, there were 101.7 males. For every 100 females age 18 and over, there were 105.7 males.

The median household income was $52,500, and the median family income was $62,500. Males had a median income of $40,250 versus $26,071 for females. The per capita income for the township was $23,720. None of the families and 1.0% of the population were living below the poverty line, including no under eighteens and 6.7% of those over 64.
