= Owatonna Township, Steele County, Minnesota =

Owatonna Township, Minnesota
- Township
- Location within the state of Minnesota Owatonna Township, Minnesota (the United States)
- Coordinates: 44°3′24″N 93°13′38″W
- Country: United States
- State: Minnesota
- County: Steele

Area
  - Total: 25.1 sq mi (65.1 km^{2})
  - Land: 25.1 sq mi (65.0 km^{2})
  - Water: 0.039 sq mi (0.1 km^{2})
- Elevation: 1,204 ft (367 m)

Population (2000)
  - Total: 771
  - Density: 31/sq mi (11.9/km^{2})
- Time zone: UTC-6 (Central (CST))
  - Summer (DST): UTC-5 (CDT)
- ZIP code: 55060
- Area code: 507
- FIPS code: 27-49318
- GNIS feature ID: 0665244

Owatonna Township (/ˌoʊwəˈtɒnə/) is a township in Steele County, Minnesota, United States. The population was 771 at the 2000 census.

== Geography ==
According to the United States Census Bureau, the township has a total area of 25.1 square miles (65.1 km^{2}), of which 25.1 square miles (65.0 km^{2}) is land and 0.04 square mile (0.1 km^{2}) (0.12%) is water.

== Demographics ==
As of the census of 2000, there were 771 people, 289 households, and 221 families residing in the township. The population density was 30.7 inhabitants per square mile (11.9/km^{2}). There were 302 housing units at an average density of 12.0/sq mi (4.6/km^{2}). The racial makeup of the township was 96.24% White, 1.82% Asian, 0.26% from other races, and 1.69% from two or more races. Hispanic or Latino of any race were 2.33% of the population.

There were 289 households, out of which 35.6% had children under the age of 18 living with them, 66.4% were married couples living together, 5.2% had a female householder with no husband present, and 23.2% were non-families. 18.3% of all households were made up of individuals, and 7.6% had someone living alone who was 65 years of age or older. The average household size was 2.67 and the average family size was 3.03.

In the township the population was spread out, with 27.9% under the age of 18, 6.7% from 18 to 24, 25.2% from 25 to 44, 25.2% from 45 to 64, and 15.0% who were 65 years of age or older. The median age was 38 years. For every 100 females, there were 107.8 males. For every 100 females age 18 and over, there were 105.9 males.

The median income for a household in the township was $51,250, and the median income for a family was $54,327. Males had a median income of $35,568 versus $29,167 for females. The per capita income for the township was $24,037. About 2.7% of families and 2.2% of the population were below the poverty line, including 3.1% of those under age 18 and 4.7% of those age 65 or over.
