= Ellendale, Minnesota =

City in Minnesota, United States

Ellendale
- City
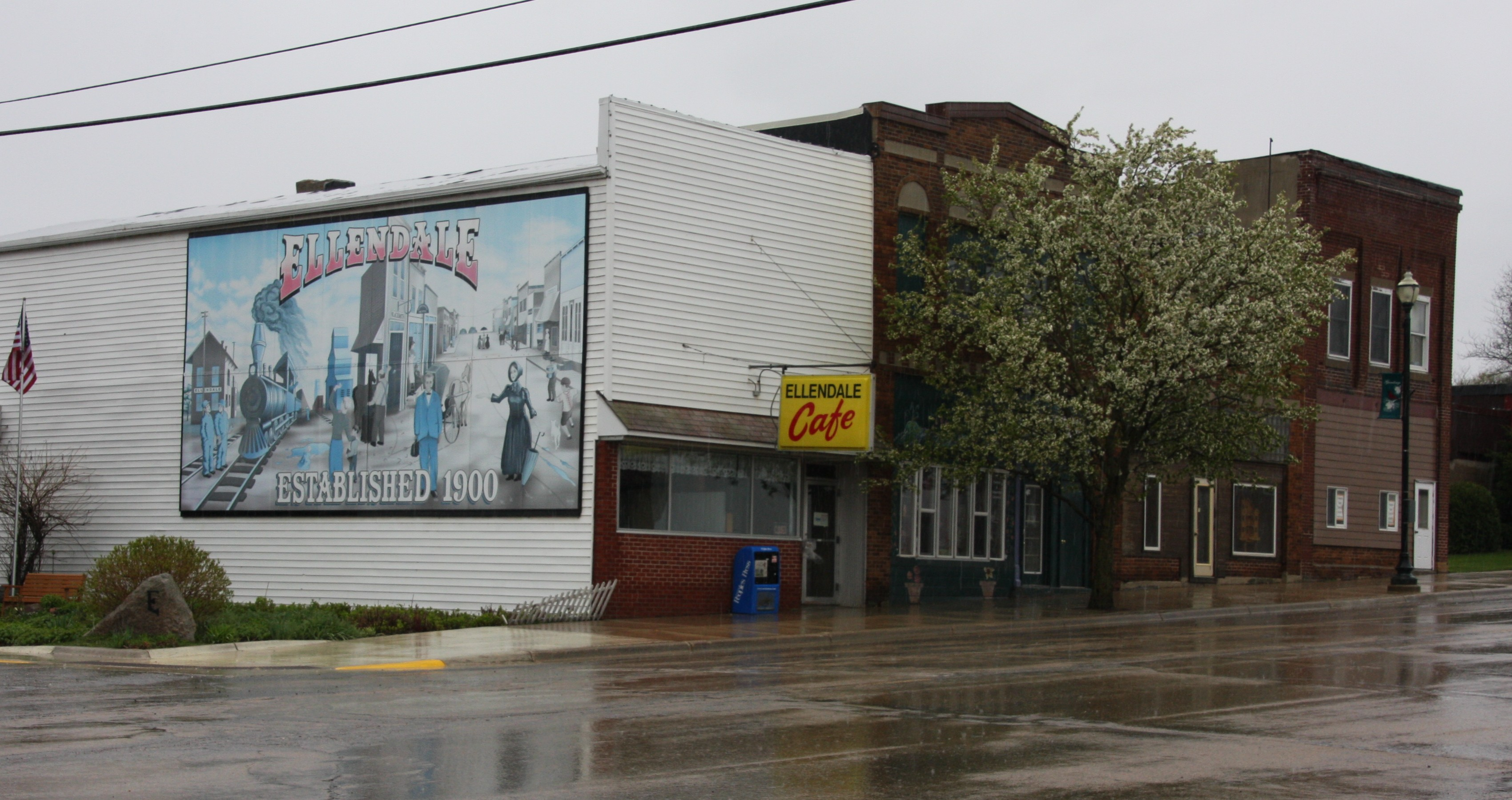

- Location of Ellendale within Steele County, Minnesota
- Coordinates: 43°52′22″N 93°17′58″W
- Country: United States
- State: Minnesota
- County: Steele

Area
  - Total: 0.83 sq mi (2.16 km^{2})
  - Land: 0.83 sq mi (2.16 km^{2})
  - Water: 0 sq mi (0.00 km^{2})
- Elevation: 1,266 ft (386 m)

Population (2020)
  - Total: 676
  - Density: 810.6/sq mi (312.98/km^{2})
- Time zone: UTC-6 (Central (CST))
  - Summer (DST): UTC-5 (CDT)
- ZIP code: 56026
- Area code: 507
- FIPS code: 27-18746
- GNIS feature ID: 2394661
- Website: https://www.ellendalemn.com/

Ellendale is a city in Steele County, Minnesota, United States. As of the 2020 census, Ellendale had a population of 676.

== History ==
Ellendale was platted in 1900, and named for Ellen Dale Ives, the wife of a railroad official. A post office has been in operation at Ellendale since 1901.

== Geography ==
According to the United States Census Bureau, the city has a total area of 0.96 square miles (2.49 km^{2}), all of it land.

Minnesota State Highway 30 and Interstate 35 are two of the main routes in the community.

== Demographics ==
Historical population
Census	Pop.	Note	%±
1910	261		—
1920	367		40.6%
1930	385		4.9%
1940	430		11.7%
1950	476		10.7%
1960	501		5.3%
1970	569		13.6%
1980	555		−2.5%
1990	549		−1.1%
2000	590		7.5%
2010	691		17.1%
2020	676		−2.2%
U.S. Decennial Census

=== 2010 census ===
As of the census of 2010, there were 691 people, 296 households, and 190 families residing in the city. The population density was 719.8 inhabitants per square mile (277.9/km^{2}). There were 317 housing units at an average density of 330.2 per square mile (127.5/km^{2}). The racial makeup of the city was 98.6% White, 0.3% Native American, 0.1% Asian, 0.9% from other races, and 0.1% from two or more races. Hispanic or Latino of any race were 2.5% of the population.

There were 296 households, of which 31.1% had children under the age of 18 living with them, 49.3% were married couples living together, 10.1% had a female householder with no husband present, 4.7% had a male householder with no wife present, and 35.8% were non-families. 31.1% of all households were made up of individuals, and 13.8% had someone living alone who was 65 years of age or older. The average household size was 2.33 and the average family size was 2.89.

The median age in the city was 39.6 years. 24.5% of residents were under the age of 18; 8.2% were between the ages of 18 and 24; 24.5% were from 25 to 44; 26.6% were from 45 to 64; and 16.4% were 65 years of age or older. The gender makeup of the city was 50.2% male and 49.8% female.

=== 2000 census ===
As of the census of 2000, there were 590 people, 252 households, and 166 families residing in the city. The population density was 662.8 inhabitants per square mile (255.9/km^{2}). There were 260 housing units at an average density of 292.1 per square mile (112.8/km^{2}). The racial makeup of the city was 98.98% White, 0.34% Asian, 0.34% from other races, and 0.34% from two or more races. Hispanic or Latino of any race were 1.36% of the population.

There were 252 households, out of which 30.6% had children under the age of 18 living with them, 53.6% were married couples living together, 7.9% had a female householder with no husband present, and 34.1% were non-families. 30.2% of all households were made up of individuals, and 18.7% had someone living alone who was 65 years of age or older. The average household size was 2.34 and the average family size was 2.90.

In the city, the population was spread out, with 24.7% under the age of 18, 6.6% from 18 to 24, 27.3% from 25 to 44, 20.8% from 45 to 64, and 20.5% who were 65 years of age or older. The median age was 40 years. For every 100 females, there were 92.2 males. For every 100 females age 18 and over, there were 100.0 males.

The median income for a household in the city was $37,750, and the median income for a family was $50,139. Males had a median income of $31,023 versus $24,306 for females. The per capita income for the city was $19,750. About 11.4% of families and 10.1% of the population were below the poverty line, including 13.4% of those under age 18 and 13.0% of those age 65 or over.
