= Medford, Minnesota =

City in Minnesota, United States

Medford
- City
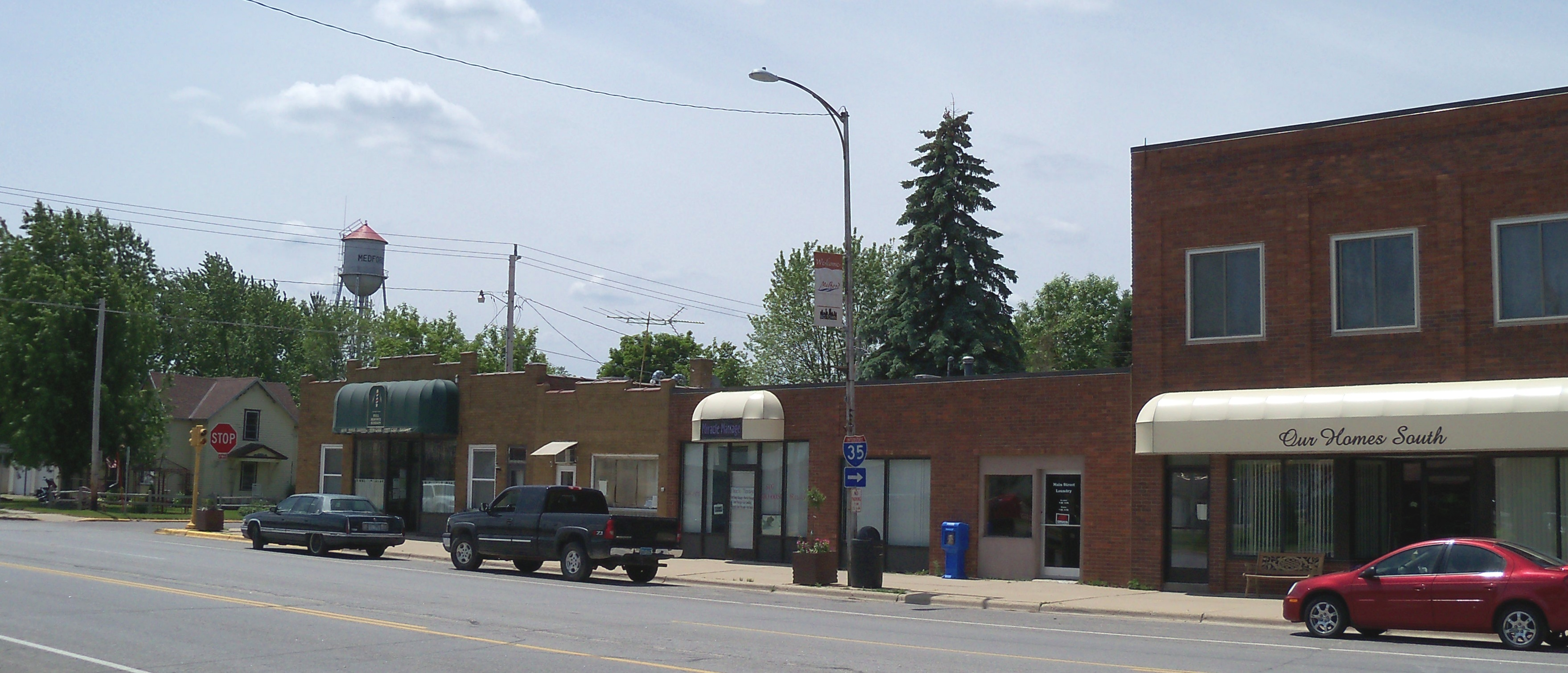
- Motto: "A Place To Call Home Since 1853"
- Location of Medford within Steele County, Minnesota
- Coordinates: 44°10′05″N 93°14′51″W
- Country: United States
- State: Minnesota
- County: Steele

Area
  - Total: 1.19 sq mi (3.09 km^{2})
  - Land: 1.19 sq mi (3.09 km^{2})
  - Water: 0 sq mi (0.00 km^{2})
- Elevation: 1,102 ft (336 m)

Population (2020)
  - Total: 1,315
  - Density: 1,101.4/sq mi (425.24/km^{2})
- Time zone: UTC-6 (Central (CST))
  - Summer (DST): UTC-5 (CDT)
- ZIP code: 55049
- Area code: 507
- FIPS code: 27-41426
- GNIS feature ID: 2395080
- Website: www.medfordminnesota.com

Medford (/ˈmɛdfərd/ MED-fərd) is a city in Steele County, Minnesota, United States. As of the 2020 census, Medford had a population of 1,315.

== History ==
Medford was platted in 1856, and named for Medford Colling, the son of an early settler. A post office has been in operation at Medford since 1855.

== Geography ==
According to the United States Census Bureau, the city has a total area of 1.15 square miles (2.98 km^{2}), all land. The Straight River flows through the city.

Interstate 35 and Steele County Roads 1, 12, 22, 23, and 45 are the main routes in the community.

== Demographics ==
Historical population
Census	Pop.	Note	%±
1940	342		—
1950	409		19.6%
1960	567		38.6%
1970	690		21.7%
1980	775		12.3%
1990	733		−5.4%
2000	984		34.2%
2010	1,239		25.9%
2020	1,315		6.1%
U.S. Decennial Census

=== 2010 census ===
As of the census of 2010, there were 1,239 people, 450 households, and 336 families living in the city. The population density was 1,077.4 inhabitants per square mile (416.0/km^{2}). There were 470 housing units at an average density of 408.7 per square mile (157.8/km^{2}). The racial makeup of the city was 96.3% White, 0.9% African American, 0.1% Native American, 0.6% Asian, 0.8% from other races, and 1.4% from two or more races. Hispanic or Latino of any race were 5.2% of the population.

There were 450 households, of which 42.9% had children under the age of 18 living with them, 58.4% were married couples living together, 11.3% had a female householder with no husband present, 4.9% had a male householder with no wife present, and 25.3% were non-families. 21.6% of all households were made up of individuals, and 8.7% had someone living alone who was 65 years of age or older. The average household size was 2.74 and the average family size was 3.19.

The median age in the city was 34.4 years. 31.2% of residents were under the age of 18; 5.6% were between the ages of 18 and 24; 31.2% were from 25 to 44; 21.7% were from 45 to 64; and 10.3% were 65 years of age or older. The gender makeup of the city was 50.9% male and 49.1% female.

=== 2000 census ===
As of the census of 2000, there were 984 people, 377 households, and 275 families living in the city. The population density was 1,444.9 inhabitants per square mile (557.9/km^{2}). There were 388 housing units at an average density of 569.8 per square mile (220.0/km^{2}). The racial makeup of the city was 94.00% White, 0.10% African American, 0.10% Native American, 0.61% Asian, 4.37% from other races, and 0.81% from two or more races. Hispanic or Latino of any race were 6.40% of the population.

There were 377 households, out of which 35.5% had children under the age of 18 living with them, 60.2% were married couples living together, 8.5% had a female householder with no husband present, and 26.8% were non-families. 21.8% of all households were made up of individuals, and 10.6% had someone living alone who was 65 years of age or older. The average household size was 2.60 and the average family size was 3.01.

In the city, the population was spread out, with 25.4% under the age of 18, 10.6% from 18 to 24, 31.3% from 25 to 44, 23.2% from 45 to 64, and 9.6% who were 65 years of age or older. The median age was 34 years. For every 100 females, there were 103.3 males. For every 100 females age 18 and over, there were 106.2 males.

The median income for a household in the city was $50,000, and the median income for a family was $55,714. Males had a median income of $31,628 versus $24,318 for females. The per capita income for the city was $18,886. About 3.3% of families and 4.4% of the population were below the poverty line, including 1.1% of those under age 18 and 9.8% of those age 65 or over.

== Government ==
Medford, Minnesota is a statutory plan "A" city - it has a weak mayor/city council structure. As of 2022, the mayor of the City of Medford is Danny Thomas. Members of the City Council in 2020 are: Chad Merritt, Manda Mueller, Chad Langeslag and Grace Bartlett.

== Landmarks ==
The "Medford Bridge" runs over the Medford Park just at the end of Steele County Road 45 entering the city. An apartment complex now occupies the area where one of the oldest school buildings that was used up until 2003. The town had decided that the old school was not large enough for the growing student body and a new school was to be built. The school now sits on the eastern edge of the city. It is presently operating at capacity of nearly 800 students, with many coming from outside the district through open enrollment. On the edge of town is the 1877 Daniel S. Piper House, Minnesota's only surviving example of a New England-style interconnected farmstead. It is listed on the National Register of Historic Places.

== Notable person ==
- Lynn Frazier – (1874–1947), former governor of North Dakota; first governor ever recalled. Born in Medford.
