= Minnesota State Highway 251 =

State highway in Minnesota, United States

Trunk Highway 251
- MN 251 highlighted in red

Route information
- Maintained by MnDOT
- Length: 16.374 mi (26.351 km)
- Existed: July 1, 1949–present

Major junctions
- West end: I-35 / CSAH 31 at Clarks Grove
- East end: US 218 north of Austin

Location
- Country: United States
- State: Minnesota
- Counties: Freeborn, Mower

Highway system
- Minnesota Trunk Highway System; Interstate; US; State; Legislative; Scenic
← MN 250	→ MN 252

Minnesota State Highway 251 (MN 251) is a 16.374-mile-long (26.351 km) highway in southeast Minnesota, which runs from its interchange with Interstate 35 at Clarks Grove and continues east to its eastern terminus at its intersection with U.S. Highway 218 in Lansing Township, north of Austin.

== Route description ==
Highway 251 serves as an east–west route in southeast Minnesota between Clarks Grove, Hollandale, Corning, and Lansing Township near Austin.

Highway 251 is also known as Park Avenue in Hollandale.

At its western terminus interchange with I-35, Highway 251 becomes Freeborn County Road 31, also known as Main Street in Clarks Grove.

== History ==
Highway 251 was authorized on July 1, 1949.

The route was paved between Clarks Grove and Maple Island and between Corning and U.S. 218 at the time it was marked. Originally, the highway turned south at the county line and followed present-day County Road 2 east to U.S. 218. The highway was moved to its current alignment in 1952. This new routing, as well as the remaining gravel portion of the roadway, was paved in 1954 or 1955.

Highway 251 originally extended into Clarks Grove proper to intersect U.S. 65 (present-day County Road 45) until Interstate 35 was built.

== Major intersections ==
County	Location	mi	km	Destinations	Notes
Freeborn	Bath Township	0.000– 0.153	0.000– 0.246	I-35 / CR 31 west (Main Street)	Interchange
Freeborn	Bath Township	0.308	0.496	CR 45	
Freeborn	Geneva–Riceland township line	3.764	6.058	CR 26	
Freeborn	Hollandale	6.026	9.698	CR 28 (Central Avenue)	
Freeborn	Maple Island	7.795	12.545	CR 30	
Freeborn	Newry Township	10.290	16.560	CR 34 north	
Freeborn	Moscow Township	10.532	16.950	CR 34 south	
Freeborn–Mower county line		13.794	22.199	CR 36	
Mower	Udolpho–Lansing township line	16.780	27.005	US 218	
1.000 mi = 1.609 km; 1.000 km = 0.621 mi
