= Shell Rock Township =

Shell Rock Township may refer to the following townships in the United States:

- Shell Rock Township, Butler County, Iowa
- Shell Rock Township, Greenwood County, Kansas
- Shell Rock Township, Freeborn County, Minnesota
