= Shell Rock =

Shell Rock may refer to:

- Shell Rock Natural Area, a protected area in Baca County, Colorado, USA
- Shell Rock Township, Butler County, Iowa, a township in Iowa
  - Shell Rock, Iowa, a city in this township
- Shell Rock Township, Freeborn County, Minnesota, a township in
- Shell Rock River, the namesake of the locations in Iowa and Minnesota, USA
- Shell Rock Township, Greenwood County, Kansas, a township in
- Shell Rock (San Marcos, Texas)
