= Maple Island, Freeborn County, Minnesota =

Unincorporated community in Minnesota, United States

Maple Island
- Unincorporated community
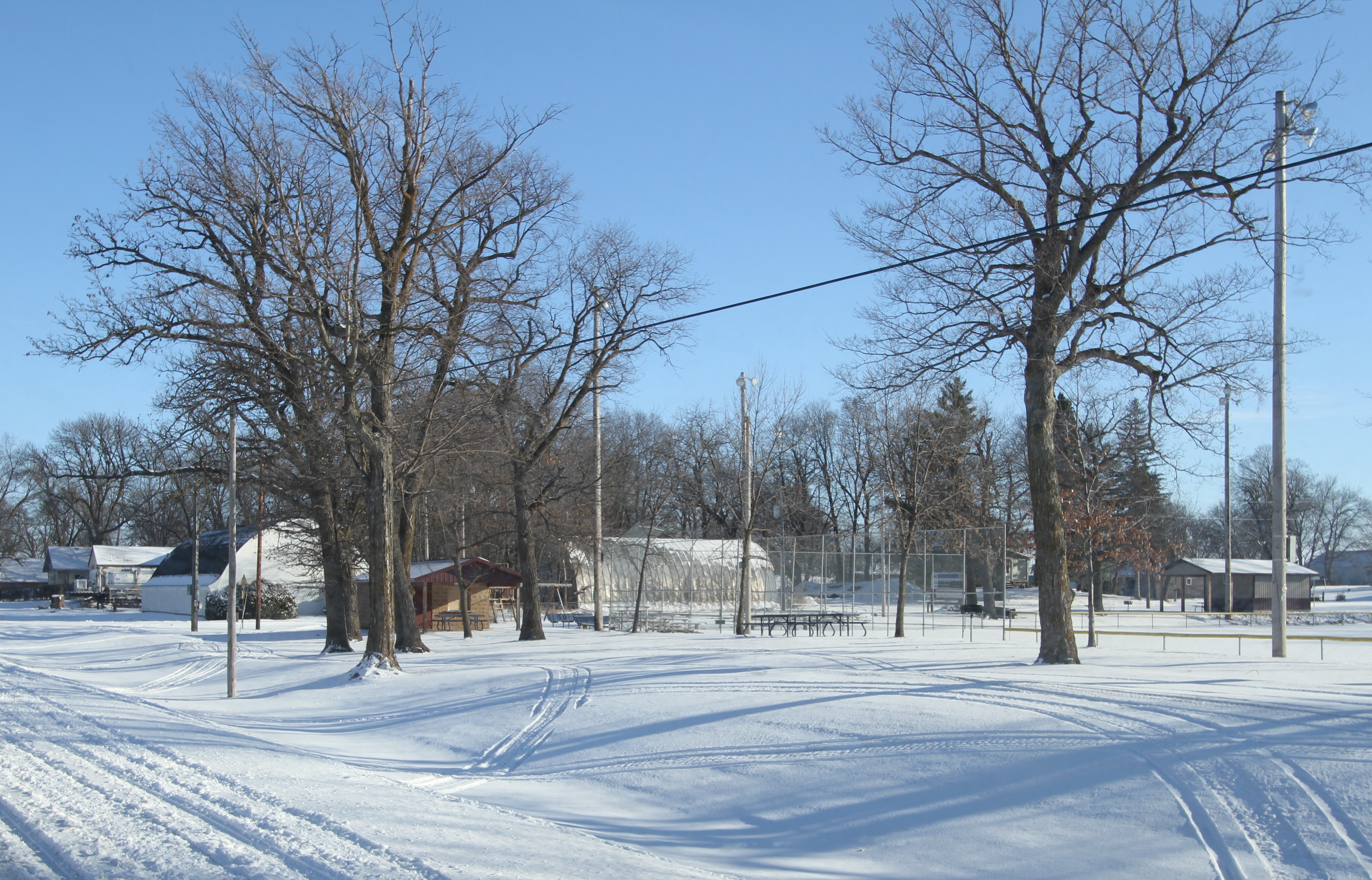

- Location within Minnesota Location within the United States
- Coordinates: 43°45′33″N 93°09′51″W
- Country: United States
- State: Minnesota
- County: Freeborn
- Township: Newry Township and Moscow Township
- Elevation: 1,217 ft (371 m)
- Time zone: UTC-6 (Central (CST))
  - Summer (DST): UTC-5 (CDT)
- ZIP code: 56045
- Area code: 507
- GNIS feature ID: 647478

Maple Island is an unincorporated community in Freeborn County, Minnesota, United States. It is located within Newry Township and Moscow Township.

The community is located east of Hollandale along State Highway 251 near Freeborn County Road 30. Other nearby places include Corning, Blooming Prairie, Geneva, and Clarks Grove.

The Chicago, Rock Island and Pacific Railroad had a station at Maple Island.
