= Straight River (southern Minnesota) =

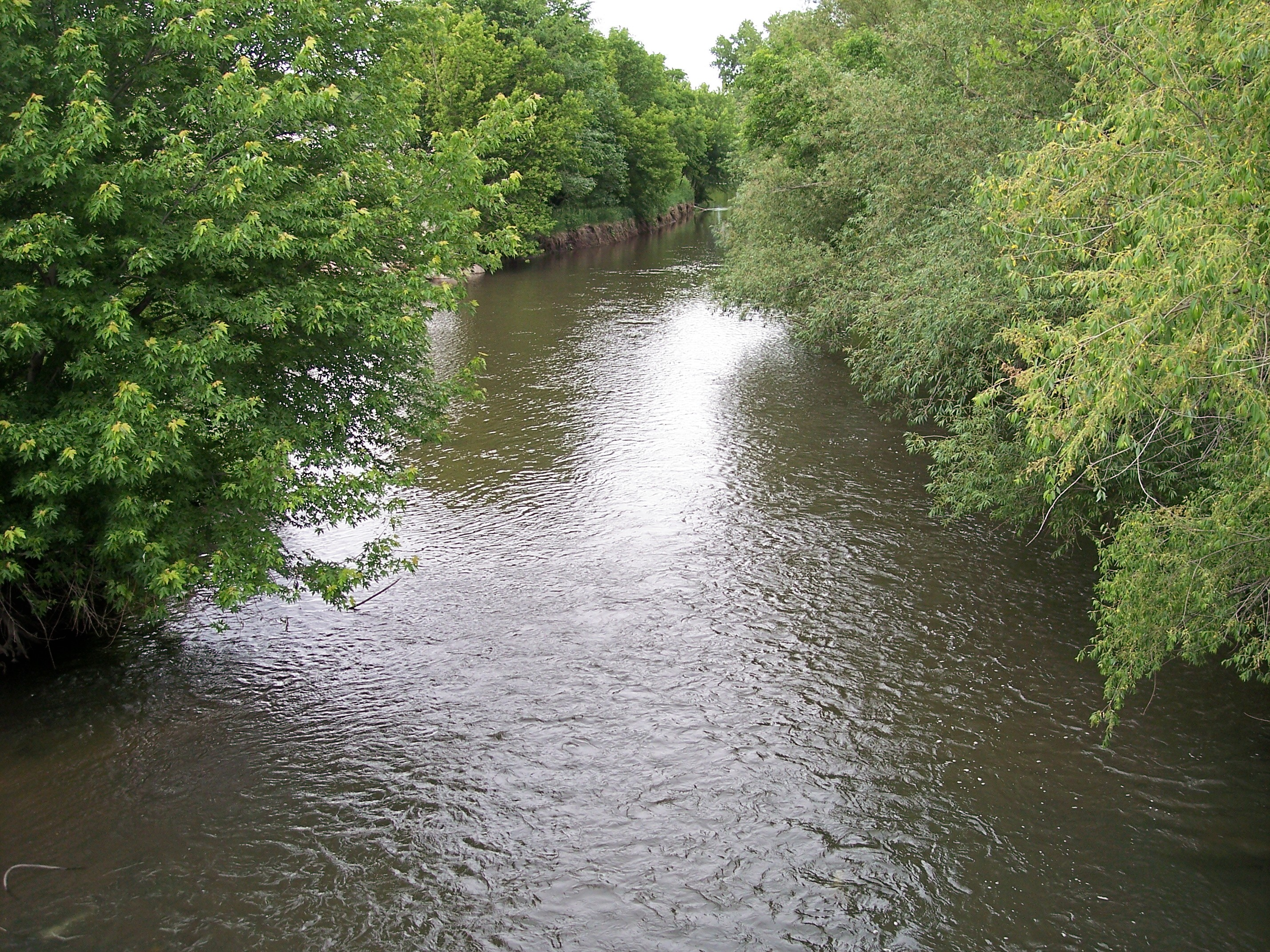
- The Straight River in Owatonna in 2007

- Location of the mouth of the Straight River in Faribault, Minnesota
- Native name: Wakpá Owóthaŋna (Dakota)

Location
- Country: United States
- State: Minnesota
- Counties: Rice, Le Sueur, Steele, Freeborn

Physical characteristics
- Source
  - location: Geneva Township, Freeborn County
  - coordinates: 43°49′58″N 93°15′46″W
  - elevation: 1,214 ft (370 m)
- Mouth: Cannon River
  - location: Faribault Township, Rice County
  - coordinates: 44°18′36″N 93°16′13″W
  - elevation: 958 ft (292 m)
- Length: 55.6 mi (89.5 km)
- Basin size: 450 mi^{2} (1,200 km^{2})
- Discharge
  - location: near Faribault
  - average: 293 cu ft/s (8.3 m^{3}/s)
  - minimum: 10 cu ft/s (0.28 m^{3}/s)
  - maximum: 6,080 cu ft/s (172 m^{3}/s)

The Straight River (Dakota: Wakpá Owóthaŋna) is a tributary of the Cannon River, 55.6 miles (89.5 km) long, in southeastern Minnesota, United States. Via the Cannon River, it is part of the watershed of the Mississippi River, draining an area of approximately 450 square miles (1,200 km^{2}) in an agricultural region.

Its name is a translation of Wakpá Owóthaŋna, the Dakota name for the river. Despite its name, the river flows in a winding course, though its valley is fairly straight. The river provided hydropower for flour milling operations in the 19th century.

== Geography ==
The source of the Straight River is considered to be just north of Geneva in Geneva Township in northern Freeborn County, though its headwaters have been altered by the construction of agricultural ditches. The river flows northward through Steele County into southern Rice County, passing through the cities of Owatonna and Medford, to its mouth at the Cannon River in Faribault.

The Minnesota Department of Natural Resources has identified the Straight River as a route for canoeing. The river flows generally through farmland; its narrow riparian corridor is wooded, predominantly by elm, willow, poplar and maple. Its course is characterized by occasional riffles, with one section of rapids in Clinton Falls Township in northern Steele County. Fish species in the river include northern pike, crappie, smallmouth bass and carp.

Chief tributaries of the Straight River include Turtle Creek in central Steele County, Maple Creek, which rises from Rice Lake in eastern Steele County and joins the Straight River in Owatonna, Crane Creek, rising in Waseca and flowing into the Straight River to the north of Owatonna, and Medford Creek.

== Flow rate ==
At the United States Geological Survey's stream gauge upstream of Faribault, the annual mean flow of the river between 1966 and 2005 was 293 cubic feet per second (8.3 m^{3}/s). The highest recorded flow during the period was 6,080 cu ft/s (172 m^{3}/s) on June 12, 2004. The lowest recorded flow was 10 cu ft/s (0.28 m^{3}/s) on October 27, 1976.

== See also ==
- List of rivers of Minnesota
- Clinton Falls Bridge
- River Bend Nature Center
