= Richard P. Braun Bridge =

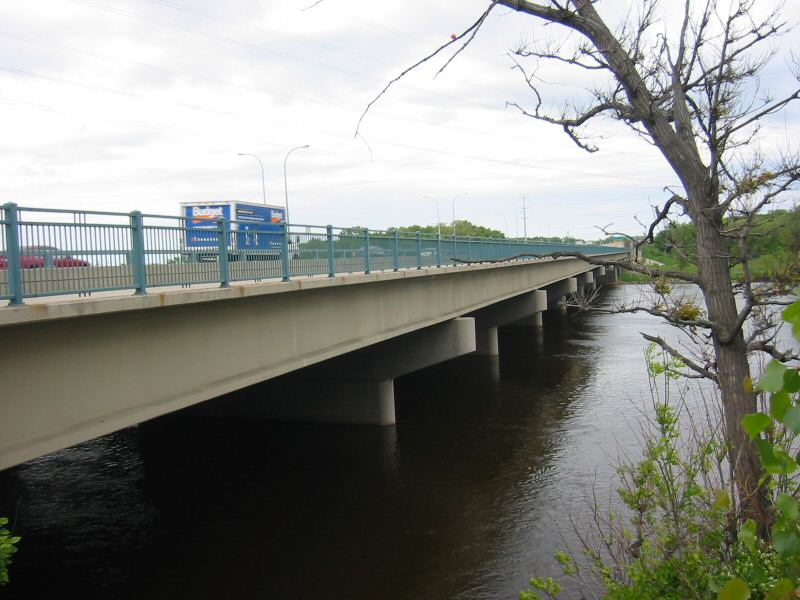
- Coordinates: 45.129151°N 93.298918°W
- Carries: Eight lanes of MN 610
- Crosses: Mississippi River
- Locale: Brooklyn Park, Minnesota-Coon Rapids, Minnesota
- Maintained by: Minnesota Department of Transportation
- ID number: 27239 (westbound), 27252 (eastbound)

Characteristics
- Design: Concrete girder bridge
- Total length: 1,326 feet (404 meters)
- Width: 96 feet (29 m) westbound, 69 feet (21 m) eastbound
- Longest span: 122 feet
- Clearance below: 21 feet

History
- Opened: 1985 (westbound span), 1999 (eastbound span)

Statistics
- Daily traffic: 39000

Location
- Interactive map of Richard P. Braun Bridge

Richard P. Braun Bridge is a pair of 10-span concrete girder bridges spanning the Mississippi River between Brooklyn Park, Minnesota and Coon Rapids, Minnesota. The eastbound span was built in 1985 to connect Minnesota State Highway 252 with Minnesota State Highway 610 in Coon Rapids. The westbound span was built in 1999 as part of the continued construction of Highway 610 through Brooklyn Park. Richard P. Braun is a former Mn/DOT Commissioner from 1979 to 1986.

There is a walkway on the south side of the bridge that connects a trail along West River Road in Brooklyn Park with a trail along the east side of the river in Coon Rapids. The trail on the east side leads to the Coon Rapids Dam, about a mile and a half north.

== See also ==
- List of crossings of the Upper Mississippi River
