= Nunda Township =

Nunda Township may refer to one of the following places in the United States:

- Nunda Township, McHenry County, Illinois
- Nunda Township, Michigan
- Nunda Township, Freeborn County, Minnesota
- Nunda Township, Lake County, South Dakota, in Lake County, South Dakota
