= Gordonsville, Minnesota =

Unincorporated community in Minnesota, United States

Gordonsville
- Unincorporated community
- Location within Minnesota Location within the United States
- Coordinates: 43°30′46″N 93°15′13″W
- Country: United States
- State: Minnesota
- County: Freeborn
- Elevation: 1,217 ft (371 m)
- Time zone: UTC-6 (Central (CST))
  - Summer (DST): UTC-5 (CDT)
- Area code: 507
- GNIS feature ID: 644276

Gordonsville is an unincorporated community in Shell Rock Township, Freeborn County, Minnesota, United States. It is southeast of Albert Lea, along U.S. Highway 65.

== History ==
A post office was established at Gordonsville in 1862, and remained in operation until it was discontinued in 1965. The community derives its name from T. J. Gordon and W. H. H. Gordon, father and son, who both served as early postmasters. Gordonsville was platted in 1880.
