= Emily Ford =

Emily Ford may refer to:

- Emily Ford (artist) (1850–1930), English artist and campaigner
- Emily Ford (outdoorswoman) (born c. 1993), American outdoorswoman
- Emily Ford (rower) (born 1994), English rower
