= Hayward, Minnesota =

City in Minnesota, United States

Hayward
- City
- Location of Hayward, Minnesota
- Coordinates: 43°38′58″N 93°14′49″W
- Country: United States
- State: Minnesota
- County: Freeborn

Government
  - Mayor: Willis Pfieffer

Area
  - Total: 0.61 sq mi (1.58 km^{2})
  - Land: 0.61 sq mi (1.58 km^{2})
  - Water: 0 sq mi (0.00 km^{2})
- Elevation: 1,250 ft (380 m)

Population (2020)
  - Total: 252
  - Density: 413.9/sq mi (159.82/km^{2})
- Time zone: UTC-6 (Central (CST))
  - Summer (DST): UTC-5 (CDT)
- ZIP code: 56043
- Area code: 507
- FIPS code: 27-27944
- GNIS feature ID: 2394338
- Website: www.cityofhaywardmn.gov

Hayward is a city in Freeborn County, Minnesota, United States, near Albert Lea. As of the 2020 census, Hayward had a population of 252.

== History ==
Hayward was named after George S. Hayward, a "prominent citizen of the early days". Hayward was settled around 1855 and was formally incorporated in 1925.

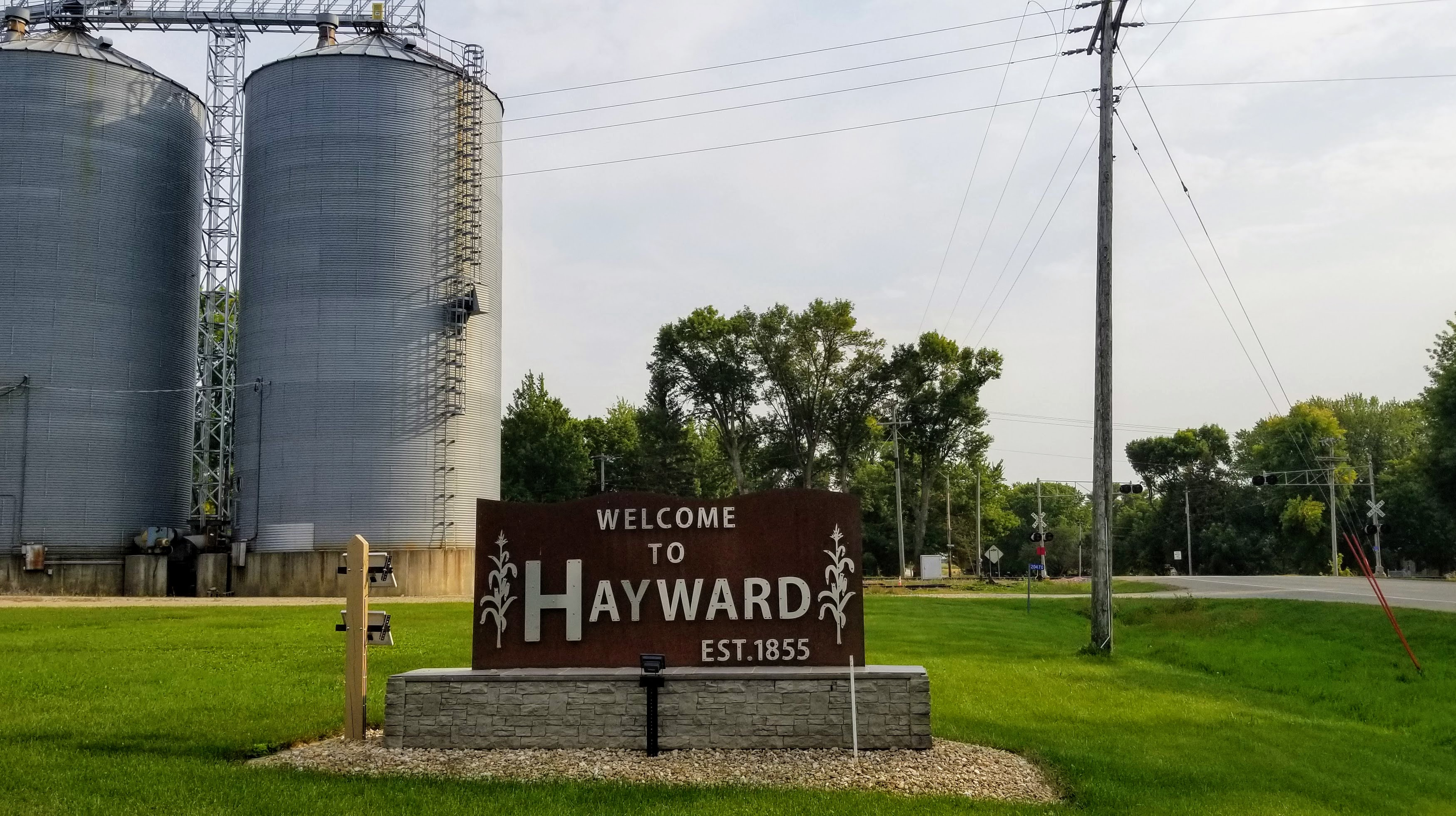
Sign welcoming visitors to Hayward.

== Geography ==
According to the United States Census Bureau, the city has a total area of 0.63 square miles (1.63 km^{2}), all land.

The city of Hayward is geographically within Hayward Township but is a separate entity.

Hayward is located along Interstate 90, as well as Freeborn County Roads 26 and 46.

== Demographics ==
Historical population
Census	Pop.	Note	%±
1930	158		—
1940	184		16.5%
1950	241		31.0%
1960	258		7.1%
1970	261		1.2%
1980	294		12.6%
1990	246		−16.3%
2000	249		1.2%
2010	250		0.4%
2020	252		0.8%
U.S. Decennial Census

=== 2010 census ===
As of the census of 2010, there were 250 people, 114 households, and 72 families living in the city. The population density was 396.8 inhabitants per square mile (153.2/km^{2}). There were 123 housing units at an average density of 195.2 per square mile (75.4/km^{2}). The racial makeup of the city was 98.0% White, 1.6% Asian, and 0.4% from other races. Hispanic or Latino of any race were 2.0% of the population.

There were 114 households, of which 23.7% had children under the age of 18 living with them, 49.1% were married couples living together, 12.3% had a female householder with no husband present, 1.8% had a male householder with no wife present, and 36.8% were non-families. 32.5% of all households were made up of individuals, and 12.3% had someone living alone who was 65 years of age or older. The average household size was 2.19 and the average family size was 2.72.

The median age in the city was 44.5 years. 17.2% of residents were under the age of 18; 6.8% were between the ages of 18 and 24; 26.8% were from 25 to 44; 34% were from 45 to 64; and 15.2% were 65 years of age or older. The gender makeup of the city was 51.2% male and 48.8% female.

=== 2000 census ===
As of the census of 2000, there were 249 people, 111 households, and 74 families living in the city. The population density was 400.4 inhabitants per square mile (154.6/km^{2}). There were 116 housing units at an average density of 186.6 per square mile (72.0/km^{2}). The racial makeup of the city was 95.98% White, 4.02% from other races. Hispanic or Latino of any race were 4.02% of the population.

There were 111 households, out of which 24.3% had children under the age of 18 living with them, 55.0% were married couples living together, 8.1% had a female householder with no husband present, and 34.2% were non-families. 34.2% of all households were made up of individuals, and 22.5% had someone living alone who was 65 years of age or older. The average household size was 2.24 and the average family size was 2.84.

In the city, the population was spread out, with 23.3% under the age of 18, 6.4% from 18 to 24, 20.1% from 25 to 44, 30.1% from 45 to 64, and 20.1% who were 65 years of age or older. The median age was 46 years. For every 100 females, there were 93.0 males. For every 100 females age 18 and over, there were 91.0 males.

The median income for a household in the city was $33,750, and the median income for a family was $52,500. Males had a median income of $30,536 versus $22,361 for females. The per capita income for the city was $19,750. About 4.4% of families and 5.0% of the population were below the poverty line, including 10.9% of those under the age of eighteen and 6.5% of those 65 or over.

== Culture ==
- Extreme Makeover: Home Edition had built a house for a family in Hayward. The episode aired on December 6, 2008.
- In 1930, the longest recorded game of horseshoes was played in Hayward between the postmaster and train station agent. The game lasted five months and four days. The postmaster won - 25,000 points to 24,949.
