= Corning, Minnesota =

Unincorporated community in Minnesota, United States

- Unincorporated community
- Location within Minnesota Location within the United States
- Coordinates: 43°45′40″N 93°02′58″W
- Country: United States
- State: Minnesota
- Counties: Freeborn, Mower
- Townships: Newry, Moscow, Udolpho, Lansing
- Elevation: 1,280 ft (390 m)
- Time zone: UTC-6 (Central (CST))
  - Summer (DST): UTC-5 (CDT)
- Area code: 507
- GNIS feature ID: 654653

Corning is an unincorporated community in Freeborn and Mower counties, Minnesota, United States.
