= Riceland =

Riceland may refer to:

- Riceland Foods, an American rice and soybean marketing cooperative
- Riceland Township, Freeborn County, Minnesota, United States
- Riceland Hotel, a historic building in Stuttgart, Arkansas, United States
