= Nunda =

Nunda may refer to:

== Places ==
In the United States:

- Nunda (town), New York
- Nunda (village), New York
- Nunda, South Dakota
- Nunda Township, McHenry County, Illinois
- Nunda Township, Michigan
- Nunda Township, Minnesota

== Other uses ==
- The Nunda, Eater of People, Swahili folk tale

== See also ==
- Nundah, Australia
