= Carlston Township, Freeborn County, Minnesota =

Township in Minnesota, United States

Carlston Township
- Township
- Location within the state of Minnesota Carlston Township (the United States)
- Coordinates: 43°43′0″N 93°35′54″W
- Country: United States
- State: Minnesota
- County: Freeborn

Area
  - Total: 36.0 sq mi (93.2 km^{2})
  - Land: 33.1 sq mi (85.7 km^{2})
  - Water: 2.9 sq mi (7.5 km^{2})
- Elevation: 1,237 ft (377 m)

Population (2000)
  - Total: 332
  - Density: 10/sq mi (3.9/km^{2})
- Time zone: UTC-6 (Central (CST))
  - Summer (DST): UTC-5 (CDT)
- FIPS code: 27-10000
- GNIS feature ID: 0663753

Carlston Township is a township in Freeborn County, Minnesota, United States. The population was 332 at the 2000 census.

Carlston Township was organized in 1858. The township was originally named Stanton, after Elias Stanton who froze to death in 1957, was initially attached to Freeborn Township. Town organizers separated from Freeborn shortly after and renamed the township to Springfield. This name was already in use in the state, so in 1959, the township name changed to Groton. Later that same year, the town petitioned for the fourth and final name change to Carlston, named for Theodore L. Carlson, a pioneer settler who had drowned the year prior. The 't' added to the spelling of Carlston is thought to have been added by mistake.

A Danish Evangelical Lutheran Church was established in 1873 and had congregations in Carlston and Alden, with Carlston's church being dedicated in 1883. In the last 20 years of the 1800s, Freeborn County, especially Carlston Township was a sought out destination for emigrants from Denmark.

== Geography ==
According to the United States Census Bureau, the township has a total area of 36.0 square miles (93 km^{2}), of which 33.1 square miles (86 km^{2}) is land and 2.9 square miles (7.5 km^{2}) (8.03%) is water.

== Demographics ==
As of the census of 2000, there were 332 people, 126 households, and 95 families residing in the township. The population density was 10.0 inhabitants per square mile (3.9/km^{2}). There were 131 housing units at an average density of 4.0 per square mile (1.5/km^{2}). The racial makeup of the township was 99.40% White and 0.60% Asian. Hispanic or Latino of any race were 0.30% of the population.

There were 126 households, out of which 32.5% had children under the age of 18 living with them, 69.8% were married couples living together, 4.8% had a female householder with no husband present, and 24.6% were non-families. 20.6% of all households were made up of individuals, and 9.5% had someone living alone who was 65 years of age or older. The average household size was 2.63 and the average family size was 3.07.

In the township the population was spread out, with 26.5% under the age of 18, 6.6% from 18 to 24, 27.7% from 25 to 44, 25.3% from 45 to 64, and 13.9% who were 65 years of age or older. The median age was 38 years. For every 100 females, there were 106.2 males. For every 100 females age 18 and over, there were 100.0 males.

The median income for a household in the township was $47,500, and the median income for a family was $49,643. Males had a median income of $32,083 versus $22,500 for females. The per capita income for the township was $21,218. None of the families and 1.2% of the population were living below the poverty line, including no under eighteens and none of those over 64.
