= Peter Lund Creek =

Stream in Freeborn County, Minnesota, U.S.

Coordinates: 43°38′46″N 93°16′24″W

Peter Lund Creek is a stream in Freeborn County, in the U.S. state of Minnesota.

The creek was named for Peter Lund, a Norwegian pioneer settler who afterward served as the township's treasurer.

== See also ==
- List of rivers of Minnesota
