= Minnesota State Highway 610 =

State highway in Minnesota, United States

Trunk Highway 610
- Hortman Memorial Highway
- MN 610 highlighted in red

Route information
- Maintained by MnDOT
- Length: 12.314 mi (19.817 km)
- Existed: June 2, 1975–present

Major junctions
- West end: I-94 / US 52 in Maple Grove
- US 169 in Brooklyn Park; MN 252 in Brooklyn Park; MN 47 in Coon Rapids
- East end: US 10 in Blaine

Location
- Country: United States
- State: Minnesota
- Counties: Hennepin, Anoka

Highway system
- Minnesota Trunk Highway System; Interstate; US; State; Legislative; Scenic
← I-535	→ I-694

State Highway 610 (MN 610) is an east–west freeway in the Twin Cities region of Minnesota. The freeway connects Interstate 94 (I-94), County Road 81 (CR 81), and CR 130 in northern Hennepin County to U.S. Highway 10 (US 10) in southern Anoka County. MN 610 crosses the Mississippi River on the Richard P. Braun Bridge between suburban Brooklyn Park and Coon Rapids. The highway is 12.3 miles (19.8 km) long.

The freeway was authorized in 1975, and most of the sections were completed by 2000 (7.2 mi or 11.6 km); the 2.6-mile (4.2 km) section westward to CR 81 in Maple Grove was completed and opened in 2011. The Minnesota Department of Transportation (MnDOT) opened the segment extending to I-94 on December 9, 2016 and in November 2025 opened the final connections westward to CR 30.

== Route description ==
MN 610 begins at an interchange complex with I-94/US 52 and CR 30 in Maple Grove. Eastbound I-94/southbound US 52 has a direct ramp to eastbound MN 610, and westbound MN 610 merges directly onto westbound I-94/northbound US 52. Traffic from eastbound CR 30 enters eastbound MN 610, while westbound MN 610 traffic may exit to CR 30 to access I-94 eastbound via a connecting onramp.

From there, the freeway continues eastward through an interchange with Maple Grove Parkway, and it turns southeasterly to its interchange with CR 81 in Maple Grove. From this point, the freeway runs eastbound through the northern suburbs of the Twin Cities. MN 610 is four lanes in width and has several interchanges with local streets and county roads before expanding to six lanes and meeting the northern terminus of MN 252 on the west bank of the Mississippi River. After MN 252 interchange, the MN 610 freeway turns to the northeast and crosses the Mississippi River on the dual-span, eight-lane Richard P. Braun Bridge.

Across the river, the freeway runs along the south side of the Coon Rapids Dam Regional Park before curving around to the east. It continues through suburban Coon Rapids as a six-lane freeway to a partial interchange with northbound MN 47. This interchange is used by eastbound traffic transitioning to westbound US 10. The final section east to US 10 in Blaine is four lanes. The second interchange along this section of the freeway with University Avenue is used to connect with MN 47 southbound. The last interconnected interchange is at the eastern terminus as traffic defaults onto US 10 eastbound.

Legally, MN 610 is defined as Route 333 in the Minnesota Statutes § 161.115(264). The highway is not marked with this legislative route number along the actual highway. The entire route of MN 610 has been listed on the National Highway System, a system of roads important to the nation's economy, defense, and mobility.

== History ==
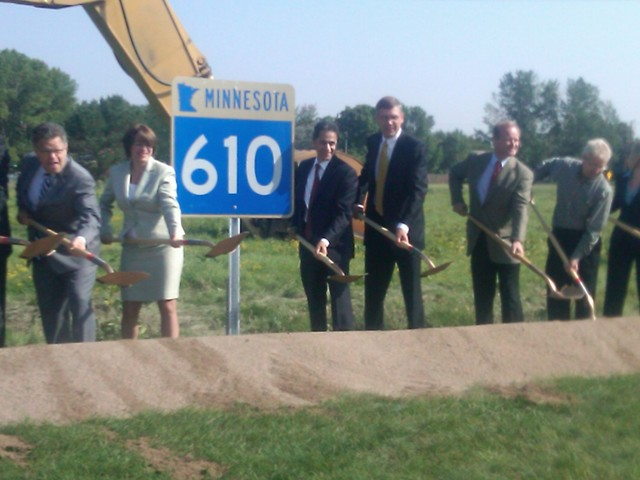
Senators Al Franken and Amy Klobuchar with other dignitaries breaking ground on the MN 610 extension

MN 610 was proposed in the middle of the 1960s as a "North Crosstown" freeway. Studies for the highway started in the 1970s. The highway was first authorized on June 2, 1975. The westbound span of the Mississippi River bridge was built in 1985, and, along with the existing freeway east of MN 252, was opened in October 1987. Officials in Minnesota proposed tolls as a means to fund the construction on the highway in 1989. Local officials supported the highway construction, but opposed the tolling plans.

West of MN 252, the freeway construction started in June 1997. The freeway was opened to traffic in 2000, with a traffic light at the intersection of MN 610 and US 169 initially. Construction on the second bridge over the Mississippi River for eastbound traffic started in 1999, to be completed in 2002.

Construction of the portion between US 169 and CR 81 was estimated to cost $48 million in 2010, of which $27 million is being funded by federal stimulus money. The project began in October 2009, and it was scheduled to be completed in July 2011. The remainder of the highway to I-94 was not on a MnDOT schedule to be built. The new western terminus was to be located at Elm Creek Boulevard in Maple Grove. The freeway continued westward from this point in the median of CR 81, but this section was to be an unused stub end past the ramps that connect to CR 81 During the 2011 Minnesota state government shutdown, construction on MN 610 was halted for 20 days. Until work stopped on July 1, 2011, a ribbon-cutting ceremony had been scheduled to open the new freeway section on July 12. The ribbon cutting ceremony was on August 17 and the road opened on August 19.

MN 610 was originally planned to extend west to I-94 in Maple Grove, and the freeway's mile markers reflected these plans, with the zero point calibrated to this terminus. A portion of this section is very unusual; it is routed down the middle of the median of CR 81 in Maple Grove, forming a roadway within a roadway.

On April 4, 2016, construction started on an interchange with Maple Grove Parkway. The final segment to I-94 opened on December 9, 2016.

On November 13, 2025, access to MN 610 was modified with the completion of an extension of CR 30. Westbound MN 610 traffic may now exit directly to CR 30 and reach eastbound I-94 via a new connecting onramp, while eastbound CR 30 traffic may enter eastbound MN 610.

On November 5, 2026, during a ceremony with Governor Tim Walz, lawmakers, and community members, MN 610 was renamed the Hortman Memorial Highway to honor late Minnesota House Speaker Melissa Hortman.

== Exit list ==
County	Location	mi	km	Exit	Destinations	Notes
Hennepin	Maple Grove	0.000	0.000	0A	I-94 west / US 52 north – St. Cloud	Western terminus; access to eastbound I-94 via Rush Creek Boulevard; opened on December 9, 2016
Hennepin	Maple Grove	0.000	0.000	0B	Rush Creek Boulevard	Westbound exit and eastbound entrance; opened on November 13, 2025
Hennepin	Maple Grove	1.244	2.002	1	CR 121 (Maple Grove Parkway)	Opened on December 9, 2016
Hennepin	Maple Grove	2.486	4.001	2	CR 130 (Elm Creek Boulevard) / CR 81	Opened on August 19, 2011; separate exit ramps westbound; signed as 2A (CR 81) and 2B (CR 130)
Hennepin	Maple Grove	3.579	5.760	3	CR 202 (Zachary Lane)	Opened on August 19, 2011
Hennepin	Brooklyn Park	5.117	8.235	5	US 169	Interchange reconstructed in 2011; former western terminus; signed as 5A (south) and 5B (north)
Hennepin	Brooklyn Park	5.806	9.344	5C	CR 103 (West Broadway Avenue)	
Hennepin	Brooklyn Park	6.817	10.971	6	CR 14 (Zane Avenue)	
Hennepin	Brooklyn Park	7.850	12.633	7	CR 12 (Noble Parkway)	
Hennepin	Brooklyn Park	9.584	15.424	9	MN 252 south – Minneapolis	Northern terminus of MN 252
Mississippi River		9.815– 10.067	15.796– 16.201	Richard P. Braun Bridge		
Anoka	Coon Rapids	10.433	16.790	10	CR 1 (East River Road)	Eastbound exit, westbound entrance
Anoka	Coon Rapids				Foley Park and Ride	Westbound entrance only
Anoka	Coon Rapids	11.066	17.809	11A	CR 3 (Coon Rapids Boulevard)	Eastbound exit, westbound entrance
Anoka	Coon Rapids	11.747	18.905	11B	MN 47 north to US 10 west	Eastbound exit, westbound entrance
Anoka	Blaine	11.922	19.187	11C	CR 51 (University Avenue)	No eastbound entrance
Anoka	Blaine	12.314	19.817		US 10 east	Eastern terminus
1.000 mi = 1.609 km; 1.000 km = 0.621 mi: Incomplete access
