= Moscow, Minnesota =

Unincorporated community in Minnesota, United States

Moscow
- Unincorporated community
- Location within Minnesota Location within the United States
- Coordinates: 43°42′26″N 93°05′54″W
- Country: United States
- State: Minnesota
- County: Freeborn
- Elevation: 1,214 ft (370 m)
- Time zone: UTC-6 (Central (CST))
  - Summer (DST): UTC-5 (CDT)
- Area code: 507
- GNIS feature ID: 654836

Moscow is an unincorporated community in Freeborn County. Minnesota, United States.

== History ==
Moscow was platted in 1857, and named after Moscow, in Russia. A post office was established at Moscow in 1859, and remained in operation until it was discontinued in 1903.
