= Freeman Township, Freeborn County, Minnesota =

Township in Minnesota, United States

Freeman Township
- Township
- Location within the state of Minnesota Freeman Township (the United States)
- Coordinates: 43°32′34″N 93°20′55″W
- Country: United States
- State: Minnesota
- County: Freeborn

Area
  - Total: 35.9 sq mi (93.0 km^{2})
  - Land: 35.9 sq mi (93.0 km^{2})
  - Water: 0.039 sq mi (0.1 km^{2})
- Elevation: 1,243 ft (379 m)

Population (2000)
  - Total: 528
  - Density: 15/sq mi (5.7/km^{2})
- Time zone: UTC-6 (Central (CST))
  - Summer (DST): UTC-5 (CDT)
- FIPS code: 27-22634
- GNIS feature ID: 0664227

Freeman Township is a township in Freeborn County, Minnesota, United States. The population was 528 at the 2000 census.

== History ==
Freeman Township was organized in 1861, and named for John Freeman, an early settler.

== Geography ==
According to the United States Census Bureau, the township has a total area of 35.9 square miles (93 km^{2}), of which 35.9 square miles (93 km^{2}) is land and 0.04 square miles (0.10 km^{2}) (0.08%) is water.

Goose Creek flows through the township.

== Transportation ==
Interstate 35 passes through the center of the township, U.S. Highway 69 passes through the northwest corner of the township near Twin Lakes, and U.S. Highway 65 passes through the northeast corner of the township near Glenville.

== Demographics ==
As of the census of 2000, there were 528 people, 204 households, and 162 families residing in the township. The population density was 14.7 inhabitants per square mile (5.7/km^{2}). There were 212 housing units at an average density of 5.9 per square mile (2.3/km^{2}). The racial makeup of the township was 99.43% White, 0.19% African American and 0.38% Asian. Hispanic or Latino of any race were 1.33% of the population.

There were 204 households, out of which 31.9% had children under the age of 18 living with them, 70.1% were married couples living together, 4.9% had a female householder with no husband present, and 20.1% were non-families. 16.2% of all households were made up of individuals, and 4.9% had someone living alone who was 65 years of age or older. The average household size was 2.59 and the average family size was 2.90.

In the township the population was spread out, with 23.3% under the age of 18, 5.3% from 18 to 24, 29.0% from 25 to 44, 23.3% from 45 to 64, and 19.1% who were 65 years of age or older. The median age was 41 years. For every 100 females, there were 116.4 males. For every 100 females age 18 and over, there were 120.1 males.

The median income for a household in the township was $42,292, and the median income for a family was $44,531. Males had a median income of $31,625 versus $22,500 for females. The per capita income for the township was $16,813. About 5.2% of families and 8.9% of the population were below the poverty line, including 9.9% of those under age 18 and 14.5% of those age 65 or over.
