= Mansfield Township, Freeborn County, Minnesota =

Township in Minnesota, United States

Mansfield Township
- Township
- Location within the state of Minnesota Mansfield Township (the United States)
- Coordinates: 43°32′45″N 93°34′55″W
- Country: United States
- State: Minnesota
- County: Freeborn

Area
  - Total: 36.1 sq mi (93.6 km^{2})
  - Land: 36.1 sq mi (93.6 km^{2})
  - Water: 0 sq mi (0.0 km^{2})
- Elevation: 1,257 ft (383 m)

Population (2000)
  - Total: 289
  - Density: 8.0/sq mi (3.1/km^{2})
- Time zone: UTC-6 (Central (CST))
  - Summer (DST): UTC-5 (CDT)
- FIPS code: 27-39950
- GNIS feature ID: 0664892

Mansfield Township is a township in Freeborn County, Minnesota, United States. The population was 289 at the 2000 census.

== History ==
Mansfield Township was organized in 1866, and named after Mansfield, Ohio, the native home of an early settler.

== Geography ==
According to the United States Census Bureau, the township has a total area of 36.1 square miles (93.6 km^{2}), of which 36.1 square miles (93.6 km^{2}) is land and 0.04 square mile (0.1 km^{2}) (0.06%) is water.

== Demographics ==
As of the census of 2000, there were 289 people, 114 households, and 90 families residing in the township. The population density was 8.0 inhabitants per square mile (3.1/km^{2}). There were 120 housing units at an average density of 3.3 per square mile (1.3/km^{2}). The racial makeup of the township was 98.96% White, 0.35% Pacific Islander, and 0.69% from two or more races. Hispanic or Latino of any race were 1.38% of the population.

There were 114 households, out of which 27.2% had children under the age of 18 living with them, 71.9% were married couples living together, 6.1% had a female householder with no husband present, and 20.2% were non-families. 18.4% of all households were made up of individuals, and 8.8% had someone living alone who was 65 years of age or older. The average household size was 2.54 and the average family size was 2.79.

In the township the population was spread out, with 20.8% under the age of 18, 9.3% from 18 to 24, 24.6% from 25 to 44, 28.4% from 45 to 64, and 17.0% who were 65 years of age or older. The median age was 43 years. For every 100 females, there were 100.7 males. For every 100 females age 18 and over, there were 108.2 males.

The median income for a household in the township was $40,714, and the median income for a family was $46,875. Males had a median income of $30,833 versus $25,625 for females. The per capita income for the township was $16,960. About 4.6% of families and 7.0% of the population were below the poverty line, including 7.8% of those under the age of eighteen and 1.6% of those 65 or over.
