= Albert Lea Township, Freeborn County, Minnesota =

Township in Minnesota, United States

Albert Lea Township
- Township
- Location within the state of Minnesota Albert Lea Township (the United States)
- Coordinates: 43°37′25″N 93°20′59″W
- Country: United States
- State: Minnesota
- County: Freeborn

Area
  - Total: 26.2 sq mi (67.9 km^{2})
  - Land: 23.4 sq mi (60.5 km^{2})
  - Water: 2.9 sq mi (7.4 km^{2})
- Elevation: 1,270 ft (387 m)

Population (2000)
  - Total: 808
  - Density: 35/sq mi (13.4/km^{2})
- Time zone: UTC-6 (Central (CST))
  - Summer (DST): UTC-5 (CDT)
- ZIP code: 56007
- Area code: 507
- FIPS code: 27-00712
- GNIS feature ID: 0663402

Albert Lea Township (/ˌælbərt ˈliː/ AL-bərt LEE) is a township in Freeborn County, Minnesota, United States. The population was 808 at the 2000 census.

Myre-Big Island State Park is within the township.

Albert Lea Township was organized in 1857, and named after its primary village, Albert Lea.

== Geography ==
According to the United States Census Bureau, the township has a total area of 26.2 square miles (68 km^{2}), of which 23.4 square miles (61 km^{2}) is land and 2.8 square miles (7.3 km^{2}) (10.88%) is water.

== Transportation ==
Interstate 35, U.S. Highway 65, U.S. Highway 69, and County Road 46 are the main routes in the township. Other routes include County Roads 17, 18, 19, and 84.

== Demographics ==
As of the census of 2000, there were 808 people, 326 households, and 237 families residing in the township. The population density was 34.6 inhabitants per square mile (13.4/km^{2}). There were 336 housing units at an average density of 14.4/sq mi (5.6/km^{2}). The racial makeup of the township was 98.89% White, 0.12% Native American, 0.62% from other races, and 0.37% from two or more races. Hispanic or Latino of any race were 3.09% of the population.

There were 326 households, out of which 28.5% had children under the age of 18 living with them, 63.8% were married couples living together, 6.1% had a female householder with no husband present, and 27.3% were non-families. 21.5% of all households were made up of individuals, and 8.3% had someone living alone who was 65 years of age or older. The average household size was 2.48 and the average family size was 2.84.

In the township the population was spread out, with 22.4% under the age of 18, 8.8% from 18 to 24, 23.5% from 25 to 44, 29.6% from 45 to 64, and 15.7% who were 65 years of age or older. The median age was 42 years. For every 100 females, there were 106.6 males. For every 100 females age 18 and over, there were 101.6 males.

The median income for a household in the township was $42,500, and the median income for a family was $51,136. Males had a median income of $35,179 versus $22,500 for females. The per capita income for the township was $18,628. About 4.3% of families and 10.1% of the population were below the poverty line, including 18.1% of those under age 18 and 8.7% of those age 65 or over.
