= Clinton Falls Bridge =

Bridge in Minnesota, US

- Coordinates: 44°08′34″N 93°14′39″W

Statistics
- Bridge No. L-5573
- U.S. National Register of Historic Places
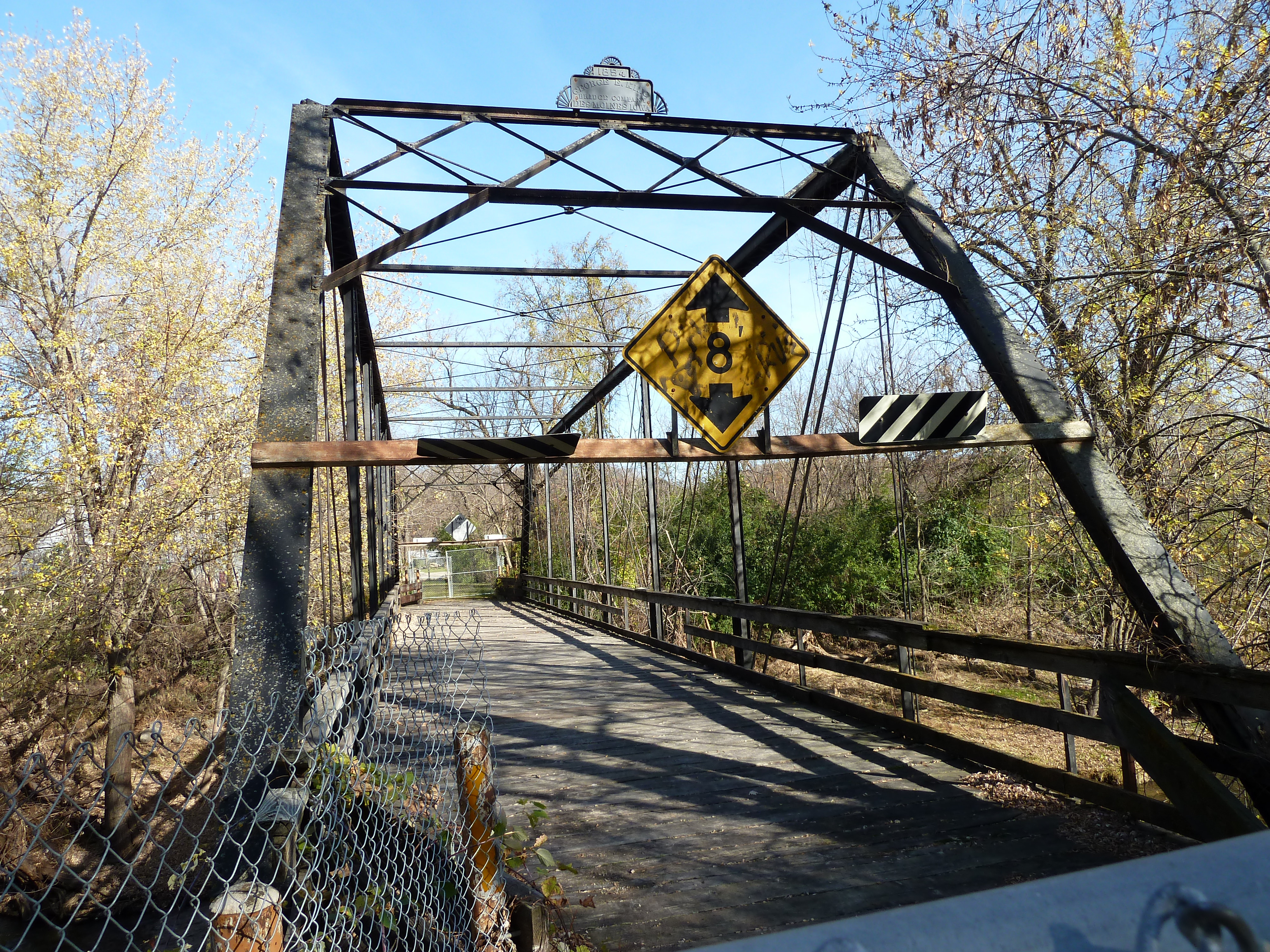
- The Clinton Falls Bridge viewed from the west

- Location within Minnesota Location within the United States
- Location: Township Road 95 over the Straight River, Clinton Falls Township, Minnesota
- Area: Less than one acre
- Built: 1894
- Built by: George E. King Bridge Company
- Architectural style: Pratt through truss
- MPS: Iron and Steel Bridges in Minnesota MPS
- NRHP reference No.: 96001613
- Added to NRHP: January 25, 1997

Location
- Interactive map of Clinton Falls Bridge

The Clinton Falls Bridge, also known as the Old Mill Bridge and formally as Bridge L-5573, is a historic steel Pratt through truss bridge that spans the Straight River in Clinton Falls Township, Minnesota. It was listed on the National Register of Historic Places in 1997 as Bridge No. L-5573 for having local significance in the theme of engineering. It was nominated for being an example of early steel truss bridge design in Minnesota.

== Structure ==
The Clinton Falls Bridge is a single span, pin-connected steel Pratt through truss structure on concrete and limestone abutments. The overall dimension of the combined substructure and superstructure is 125 feet (38 m) by 22 feet (6.7 m).

The superstructure is eight panels and includes a floor system made up of 3-by-12-inch (7.6 by 30 cm) treated timbers on five-inch (13 cm) steel I-section stringers which are themselves supported by 12-inch (30 cm) steel I-section floor beams. These beams are fastened to the hip verticals with riveted plates and are riveted directly to the intermediate posts, except for one exception: the first post to the east on the south side is welded to the floor beam with a steel plate set eight inches (20 cm) off-center; it is uncertain whether this was a repair or a correction of the design as it was being built. Both top and bottom lateral bracing consists of eye rods stabilized at intersecting points with bolted plates. The top chords, end posts, and intermediate posts are channels with riveted cover plates and lacing bars. The hip verticals are double forged eye rods, while the diagonals are double punched eye bars. The counters are turnbuckles. The lateral and portal struts are double angles to which portal bracing (double angles) is connected with ledger plates. The portal struts and bracing make up a riveted unit which is bolted to the end posts. Two-by-six-inch (5.1 by 15.2 cm) wooden guard rails are bolted to the bridge with angle sections. A builder's plate is fastened to the top portal struts at each end of the bridge.

The concrete, poured onto the limestone abutments and wing walls, was added in 1975; other than that, the bridge is essentially in original condition. A fragmentary abutment, which supported an earlier, shorter structure at the same crossing, is located west of the current east bank abutment.

== History ==
Settlement in the area of Clinton Falls Township began in the 1850s; by 1855, Steele County was created and the township officially designated. Clinton Falls was one of the county's first settlements, flourishing in large part because of the establishment of the first gristmill in the county. That mill and its associated dam were listed together on the National Register from 1986 until they were removed in 2004.

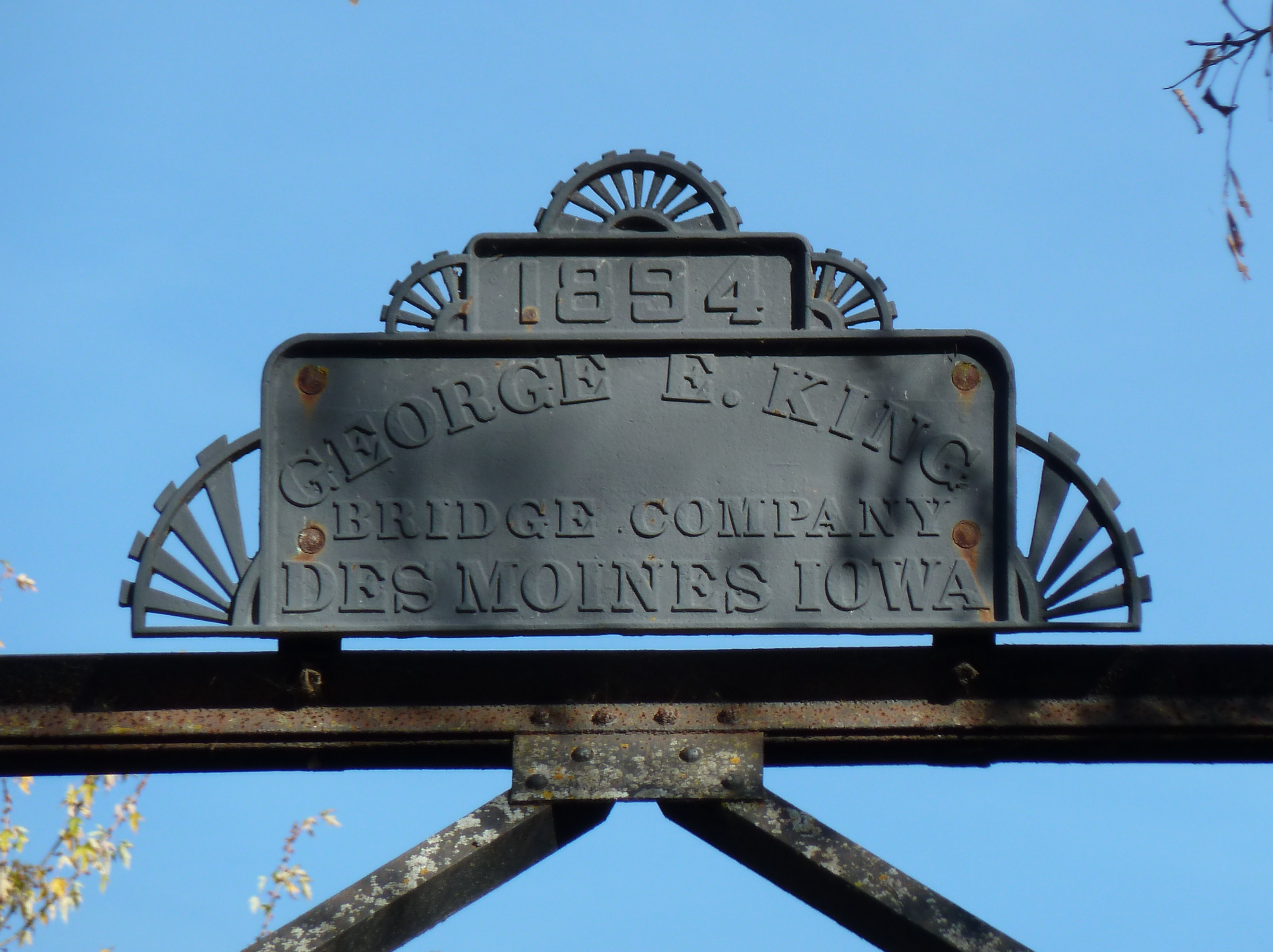
The builder's plate of the Clinton Falls Bridge

The current bridge is the second bridge built on the site. In 1867, the people of Steele County voted to build a covered bridge for approximately $3,000 (equivalent to $69,000 in 2025). It is believed that some of the abutments for that original bridge were used in the present one. On May 19, 1894, the Clinton Falls Township Board voted to build an "iron bridge" with steel joists over the river and awarded a contract to the George E. King Bridge Company of Des Moines, Iowa. The existing covered bridge was demolished in late September 1894. The old bridge was removed by September 27 and a large force began rapidly installing the new structure in its place. The new bridge was finished on October 2, 1894, and was described as "all iron and steel, except the planks and railing." On December 3, 1894, the Steele County Board agree to assume 60% of the cost of the bridge. The bridge was considered as an option for planners of the Jefferson Highway.

Over the decades, Clinton Falls Township faded away: the town's mill, school, church, store and post office all closed and the bridge became one of the few historic structures left. In 1970, the bridge was declared unsafe for vehicles and in need of repairs estimated at $3,000 (equivalent to $25,000 in 2025). With few residents living on one side, the Township Board elected to close the bridge to all traffic. The plan was met with vehement opposition from residents on the isolated side of the bridge. The situation was resolved when Reuben Kaplan, owner of the locally founded Owatonna Tool Company, donated the money to repair the abutments and cement work and put in new wood planks and railings.

It carried Township Road 95 before it was closed to traffic again in 1994, its 100th year. The Minnesota Department of Transportation made the decision after inspectors discovered that some of the steel stringers supporting the bridge deck had become dangerously thin from rust. Inspectors estimated repairs would total $105,981 to bring the bridge up to a five-ton standard weight limit. Local residents formed the "Save the Clinton Falls Bridge Committee" to raise money to repair the bridge as well as push for historic preservation. Concerned residents contacted the Minnesota Historical Society, which vetted their claims and hired a historian to prepare its NRHP nomination, which was successful. The bridge remains closed to traffic.

== Significance ==
The Clinton Falls Bridge is significant as an example of early steel truss bridge design in Minnesota. Highway bridges were an important part of European-American settlement in Minnesota. Wood and combination wood-iron bridges in various truss configurations were an important method of building medium and long spans, while masonry arch construction was preferred for short spans. Initially, wrought iron and wood were used in combination on Howe truss configurations. These bridges peaked in popularity in the 1870s. All-iron construction started to appear with bowstring arch bridges, but by the 1880s the pin-connected Pratt through truss had become the standard structural type for long span bridges in Minnesota. Steel was first used in truss bridge design in the form of connecting eye bars, but by 1895 it had replaced wrought iron in nearly all structural members. Bridges from the 1890s represent the first extensive use of this material for bridge construction in Minnesota. It is the only remaining example of the George E. King Bridge Company's work in Minnesota.

== See also ==
- List of bridges on the National Register of Historic Places in Minnesota
- National Register of Historic Places listings in Steele County, Minnesota
