= Cobb River (Minnesota) =

- The river at the former site of Zieglers Ford Bridge in Blue Earth County

- Mouth of Cobb River

Location
- Country: United States
- State: Minnesota
- Counties: Blue Earth, Waseca, Fairbault, and Freeborn Counties

Physical characteristics
- Source
  - coordinates: 43.7544007°N 93.5799416°W
- Mouth
  - coordinates: 44.0774656°N 94.0007877°W
- Length: 78.6-mile-long (126.5 km)

Basin features
- Progression: Cobb River→ Le Sueur River→ Minnesota River→ Mississippi River→ Gulf of Mexico
- River system: Le Sueur River
- Tributaries
  - left: Little Cobb River

The Cobb River (also known as the Big Cobb River) and its tributary the Little Cobb River are small rivers in southern Minnesota in the United States. The Cobb River is a 78.6-mile-long (126.5 km) tributary of the Le Sueur River. Via the Le Sueur, Blue Earth and Minnesota rivers, it is part of the watershed of the Mississippi River.

== Course ==
The Cobb River rises at the outlet of Freeborn Lake in northwestern Freeborn County and flows generally northwestwardly through northeastern Faribault, southwestern Waseca, and southwestern Blue Earth counties. It flows into the Le Sueur River from the south, about 6 miles (10 km) south of Mankato.

In Blue Earth County it collects the Little Cobb River, which rises in southwestern Waseca County. The Little Cobb flows generally westward 36.9 miles (59.4 km) to its confluence with the Big Cobb River.

The Ziegler's Ford Bridge, built in 1904 over the Cobb River, is an example of the pin-connected Pratt through truss bridges once common in Minnesota, and one of the few built by a company based outside of Minneapolis–Saint Paul. It was removed in 1995.

== See also ==
- List of rivers of Minnesota
- List of longest streams of Minnesota
