= Clinton Falls Township, Steele County, Minnesota =

Clinton Falls Township, Minnesota
- Township
- Location within the state of Minnesota Clinton Falls Township, Minnesota (the United States)
- Coordinates: 44°8′15″N 93°14′14″W
- Country: United States
- State: Minnesota
- County: Steele

Area
  - Total: 16.1 sq mi (41.8 km^{2})
  - Land: 16.1 sq mi (41.6 km^{2})
  - Water: 0.077 sq mi (0.2 km^{2})
- Elevation: 1,220 ft (372 m)

Population (2000)
  - Total: 452
  - Density: 28/sq mi (10.9/km^{2})
- Time zone: UTC-6 (Central (CST))
  - Summer (DST): UTC-5 (CDT)
- FIPS code: 27-12052
- GNIS feature ID: 0663828

Clinton Falls Township is a township in Steele County, Minnesota, United States. The population was 452 at the 2000 census.

== History ==
Clinton Falls Township was organized in 1858.

The 1894 Clinton Falls Bridge was listed on the National Register of Historic Places in 1997.

== Geography ==
According to the United States Census Bureau, the township has a total area of 16.1 square miles (42 km^{2}), of which 16.1 square miles (42 km^{2}) is land and 0.1 square miles (0.26 km^{2}) (0.37%) is water. The Straight River flows northwardly through the township.

== Demographics ==
As of the census of 2000, there were 452 people, 158 households, and 124 families residing in the township. The population density was 28.1 inhabitants per square mile (10.8/km^{2}). There were 164 housing units at an average density of 10.2 per square mile (3.9/km^{2}). The racial makeup of the township was 91.59% White, 2.43% Asian, 2.43% from other races, and 3.54% from two or more races. Hispanic or Latino of any race were 9.07% of the population.

There were 158 households, out of which 30.4% had children under the age of 18 living with them, 72.2% were married couples living together, 3.2% had a female householder with no husband present, and 21.5% were non-families. 17.7% of all households were made up of individuals, and 8.9% had someone living alone who was 65 years of age or older. The average household size was 2.58 and the average family size was 2.94.

In the township the population was spread out, with 25.0% under the age of 18, 7.3% from 18 to 24, 26.8% from 25 to 44, 28.3% from 45 to 64, and 12.6% who were 65 years of age or older. The median age was 40 years. For every 100 females, there were 113.2 males. For every 100 females age 18 and over, there were 114.6 males.

The median income for a household in the township was $46,250, and the median income for a family was $53,000. Males had a median income of $35,250 versus $29,375 for females. The per capita income for the township was $24,864. About 2.4% of families and 6.9% of the population were below the poverty line, including 1.8% of those under age 18 and none of those age 65 or over.

== Notable person ==
- Alfred R. Lindesmith, noted sociologist and author of The Addict and the Law, was born in Clinton Falls Township in 1905.
