= Hartland Township, Freeborn County, Minnesota =

Township in Minnesota, United States

Hartland Township
- Township
- Location within the state of Minnesota Hartland Township (the United States)
- Coordinates: 43°47′15″N 93°28′42″W
- Country: United States
- State: Minnesota
- County: Freeborn

Area
  - Total: 35.9 sq mi (93.0 km^{2})
  - Land: 35.9 sq mi (92.9 km^{2})
  - Water: 0.039 sq mi (0.1 km^{2})
- Elevation: 1,270 ft (387 m)

Population (2000)
  - Total: 298
  - Density: 8.3/sq mi (3.2/km^{2})
- Time zone: UTC-6 (Central (CST))
  - Summer (DST): UTC-5 (CDT)
- ZIP code: 56042
- Area code: 507
- FIPS code: 27-27422
- GNIS feature ID: 0664407

Hartland Township is a township in Freeborn County, Minnesota, United States. The population was 298 at the 2000 census.

Hartland Township was organized in 1858. A share of the early settlers being natives of Hartland, Vermont caused the name to be selected.

== Geography ==
According to the United States Census Bureau, the township has a total area of 35.9 square miles (93 km^{2}), of which 35.9 square miles (93 km^{2}) is land and 0.04 square miles (0.10 km^{2}) (0.08%) is water.

== Demographics ==
As of the census of 2000, there were 298 people, 112 households, and 82 families residing in the township. The population density was 8.3 inhabitants per square mile (3.2/km^{2}). There were 120 housing units at an average density of 3.3 per square mile (1.3/km^{2}). The racial makeup of the township was 96.31% White, 0.34% Native American, 2.35% from other races, and 1.01% from two or more races. Hispanic or Latino of any race were 2.68% of the population.

There were 112 households, out of which 36.6% had children under the age of 18 living with them, 71.4% were married couples living together, 1.8% had a female householder with no husband present, and 25.9% were non-families. 22.3% of all households were made up of individuals, and 8.9% had someone living alone who was 65 years of age or older. The average household size was 2.66 and the average family size was 3.16.

In the township the population was spread out, with 25.2% under the age of 18, 8.7% from 18 to 24, 24.8% from 25 to 44, 23.2% from 45 to 64, and 18.1% who were 65 years of age or older. The median age was 40 years. For every 100 females, there were 114.4 males. For every 100 females age 18 and over, there were 120.8 males.

The median income for a household in the township was $38,125, and the median income for a family was $41,964. Males had a median income of $31,875 versus $17,500 for females. The per capita income for the township was $15,913. About 7.2% of families and 9.5% of the population were below the poverty line, including 8.6% of those under the age of eighteen and 7.1% of those 65 or over.
