= Minnesota State Highway 252 =

State highway in Minnesota, United States

Trunk Highway 252
- MN 252 highlighted in red

Route information
- Maintained by MnDOT
- Length: 4.353 mi (7.005 km)
- Existed: c. 1977–present
- Tourist routes: Great River Road

Major junctions
- South end: I-94 / I-694 / US 52 in Brooklyn Center
- CR 109 in Brooklyn Park
- North end: MN 610 in Brooklyn Park

Location
- Country: United States
- State: Minnesota
- Counties: Hennepin

Highway system
- Minnesota Trunk Highway System; Interstate; US; State; Legislative; Scenic
← MN 251	→ MN 253

Minnesota State Highway 252 (MN 252) is a 4.4-mile-long (7.1 km) state highway in Minnesota, which runs from its interchange with Interstate 94 (I-94), I-694 and US Highway 52 (US 52) in Brooklyn Center and continues north to its northern terminus at its interchange with MN 610 in Brooklyn Park. MN 252 generally follows not far from the west bank of the Mississippi River throughout its route.

== Route description ==
MN 252 serves as a north–south highway in suburban Hennepin County between Brooklyn Center and Brooklyn Park. The route is heavily stoplighted and has a 55-mile-per-hour (89 km/h) posted speed limit. MN 252 is built as an expressway with access limited to signalized intersections and interchanges only.

MN 252, together with MN 610, serves as a connection between the northern suburbs and I-94/US 52 towards downtown Minneapolis.

The route is built as a six-lane expressway from I-94/I-694/US 52 to 73rd Avenue North. The route is built as a four-lane expressway from 73rd Avenue North to its junction with MN 610.

The 4.4-mile (7.1 km) highway is one of the most traveled highways in the state that still has traffic signals. As of 2025, MN 252 near its junction with I-94/I-694/US 52 in Brooklyn Center carried over 67,000 vehicles a day.

Legally, MN 252 is defined as part of unmarked legislative route 110 in the Minnesota Statutes. Highway 252 is not marked with this legislative number along the actual highway.

== History ==
MN 252 was marked in the late 1970s. Previously, this was the old routing of US 169 between downtown Minneapolis and the present day suburb of Champlin. Old US 169 had followed Lyndale Avenue North out of downtown Minneapolis and proceeded northbound to a junction with old US 52 (now US 169) in Champlin.

US 169 was rerouted west of that position in the late 1970s, and this route was then renumbered MN 252. After intersecting MN 610 was built, and as part of the 1988 highway swap, the portion of MN 252 north of MN 610 was turned back to Hennepin County maintenance and renumbered County Road 12.

MN 252 was built to expressway standards in the mid 1980s.

The intersection of MN 252 and 85th Avenue North in Brooklyn Park is particularly dangerous for pedestrians to cross. In 1999, an 11-year-old girl, Kara Kavanagh, was struck by a car and killed at the intersection, sparking renewed debate about building a pedestrian bridge in that location. In 2004, a pedestrian bridge was finally built in this location, and dedicated to Kara Kavanagh.

MnDOT plans to convert MN 252 to a freeway.

== Major intersections ==
The entire route is in Hennepin County.

Location	mi	km	Destinations	Notes
Brooklyn Center	0.000	0.000	I-94 east / US 52 south – Minneapolis	Southbound exit and northbound entrance
Brooklyn Center	0.083– 0.460	0.134– 0.740	I-94 west / I-694 / Great River Road (National Route) to MN 100	No access from northbound MN 252 to westbound I-94/I-694; southern end of Great River Road overlap
Brooklyn Center–Brooklyn Park line	1.459– 1.478	2.348– 2.379	73rd Avenue North	Signalized at-grade intersection
Brooklyn Park			Great River Road (National Route) (Brookdale Drive)	Northern end of Great River Road overlap
Brooklyn Park	3.233– 3.239	5.203– 5.213	CR 109 (85th Avenue North)	Signalized at-grade intersection
Brooklyn Park	3.795– 4.353	6.107– 7.005	MN 610	Interchange
1.000 mi = 1.609 km; 1.000 km = 0.621 mi: Incomplete access
