= Emily Ford (outdoorswoman) =

American sportswoman

Emily Ford (born c. 1993) is an American dog musher, long-distance hiker, and gardener.

== Career ==
Ford grew up in Brooklyn Park, Minnesota. Ford developed a love for the outdoors as a child, and spent time at her grandparents' farm in Jacobson, Minnesota. After graduating college, Ford moved to Duluth, Minnesota. In summer, she is head gardener at Glensheen Historic Estate in Duluth and is based in Willow, Alaska in winter.

Ford began long-distance hiking by completing the Superior Hiking Trail in northern Minnesota. Over the winter of 2020–21, Ford became the 78th person to thru-hike the Wisconsin Ice Age Trail, and the second person (and first woman) to do it in winter. She was accompanied on the 69-day, 1135-mile hike by a sled dog, Diggins; the pair averaged 16.5 miles per day. The journey attracted media and social media attention. It was the subject of a short documentary called Breaking Trail produced by a Minneapolis company; the film premiered at Banff Mountain Film Festival in fall 2021. In the winter of 2022, Ford (with Diggins) journeyed 28 days by ski along the Minnesota-Canada border through the Boundary Waters Canoe Area Wilderness, beginning in Crane Lake and finishing early near Grand Marais due to an impassable Pigeon River.

Ford subsequently became interested in dogsled racing and was mentored by Paul Schurke of Wintergreen dogsled center in Ely, Minnesota. In early 2024, she competed in the Copper Basin 300 and finished 21st of 35; she subsequently competed in the Kobuk 440 race and qualified for the 2025 Iditarod. In the Iditarod, Ford placed 18th (of 33 teams), and finished 3rd among 16 rookies.
