= Freeborn County, Minnesota =

County in Minnesota, United States

- County
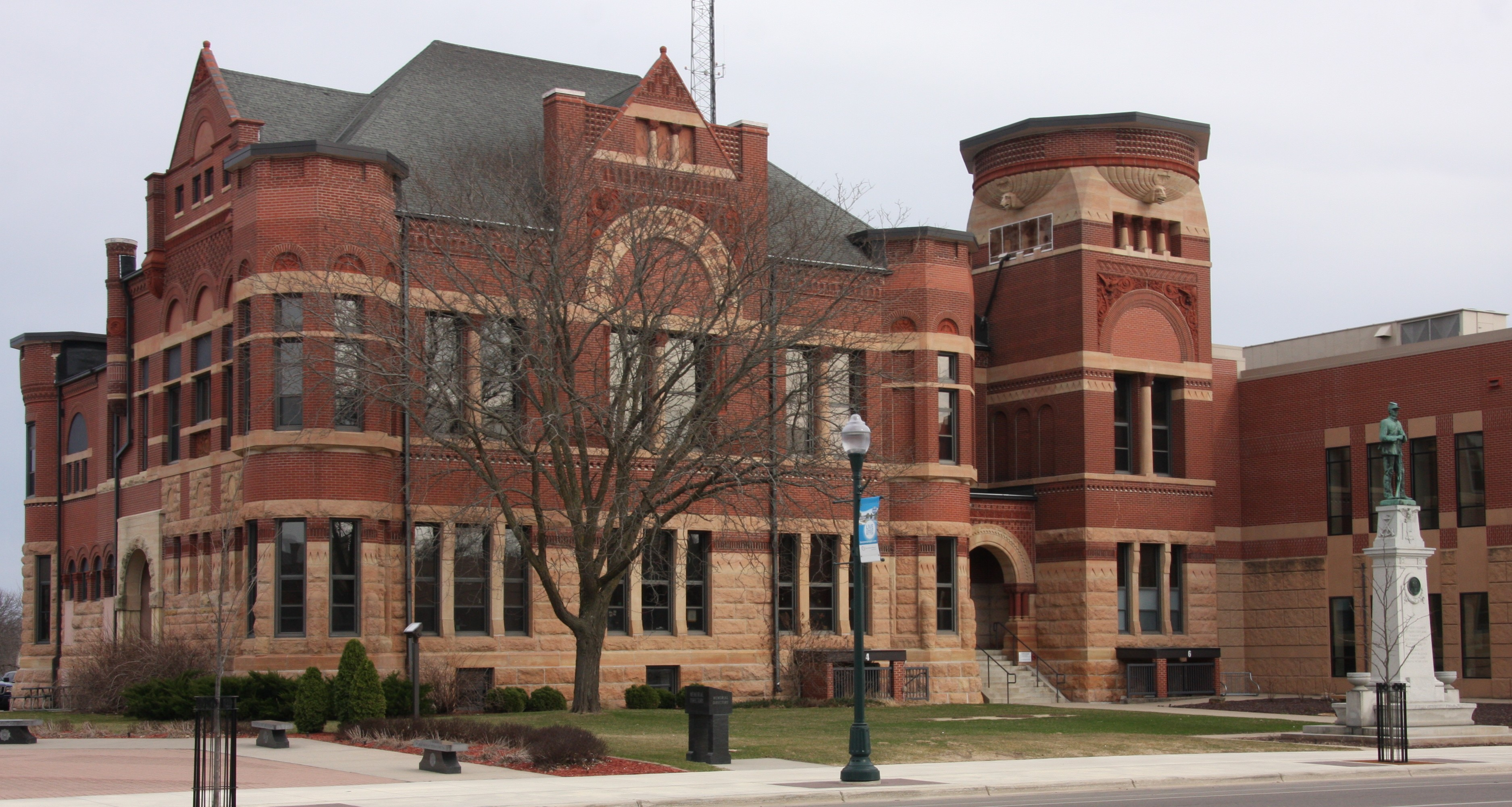
- Freeborn County Courthouse

- Location within the U.S. state of Minnesota
- Coordinates: 43°40′N 93°21′W
- Country: United States
- State: Minnesota
- Founded: February 20, 1855
- Named for: William Freeborn
- Seat: Albert Lea
- Largest city: Albert Lea

Area
  - Total: 722 sq mi (1,870 km^{2})
  - Land: 707 sq mi (1,830 km^{2})
  - Water: 15 sq mi (39 km^{2}) 2.1%

Population (2020)
  - Total: 30,895
  - Estimate (2025): 30,440 ▼
  - Density: 43.7/sq mi (16.9/km^{2})
- Time zone: UTC−6 (Central)
  - Summer (DST): UTC−5 (CDT)
- Congressional district: 1st
- Website: www.co.freeborn.mn.us

Freeborn County is a county in the state of Minnesota. As of the 2020 census, the population was 30,895. Its county seat is Albert Lea. Freeborn County comprises the Albert Lea Micropolitan Statistical Area.

== History ==
Freeborn County was created on February 20, 1855, the territory being separated from Blue Earth and Rice Counties. Twelve other Minnesota counties were created the same day by the Minnesota Territorial Legislature. Freeborn County was named for William Freeborn, an early Minnesota pioneer, merchant, and territorial legislator.

== Geography ==
Freeborn County lies on Minnesota's border with Iowa. The Shell Rock River flows southward from Albert Lea Lake in central Freeborn County, crossing into Iowa. Turtle Creek flows eastward through the upper eastern part of the county, crossing into Mower County. The terrain is hilly and etched with drainages and gullies. The Le Sueur River, a tributary of the Minnesota River, begins in the northern part of the county and flows northward into Waseca County. The Cobb River and the Maple River, two other small rivers, begin in the extreme northwest corner of the county, the Cobb from Freeborn Lake and the Maple from Penny Lake. Both run generally northwest, emptying into the LeSueur River, just upstream from where the LeSueur empties into the Minnesota River, on the western edge of Mankato. Most of the available land is devoted to agriculture. The terrain generally slopes to the south and east, although the highest point is near the northeast corner, at 1,296 ft (395 m) ASL. The county has an area of 722 square miles (1,870 km^{2}), of which 707 square miles (1,830 km^{2}) is land and 15 square miles (39 km^{2}) (2.1%) is water.

Soils of Freeborn County

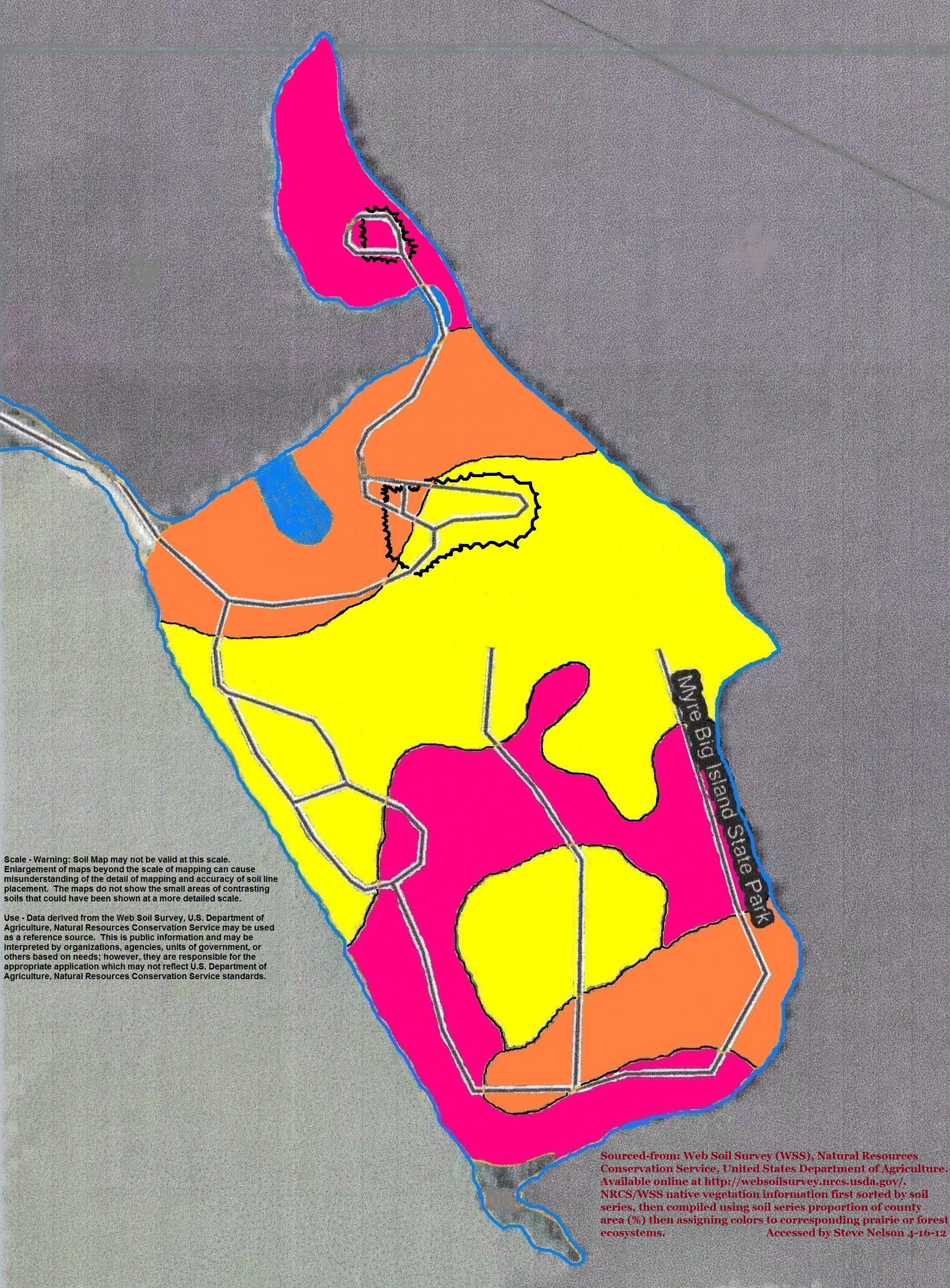
Soils of Island in Myhre-Big Island State Park

=== Lakes ===
- Albert Lea Lake
- Bear Lake
- Church Lake
- Everhart Lake
- Fountain Lake
- Freeborn Lake
- Geneva Lake
- Goose Lake
- Halls Lake
- Hickory Lake
- Lower Twin Lake
- Penny Lake
- Pickerel Lake
- School Section Lake
- State Line Lake
- Sugar Lake
- Trenton Lake (part)
- Upper Twin Lake
- White Lake

=== Protected areas ===
- Bear Lake State Wildlife Management Area
- Carex State Wildlife Management Area
- Halls Lake State Wildlife Area
- Moscow State Game Refuge
- Myre-Big Island State Park
- White Woods County Park

=== Transit ===
- Southern Minnesota Area Rural Transit

=== Major highways ===
- Interstate 35
- Interstate 90
- U.S. Highway 65
- U.S. Highway 69
- Minnesota State Highway 13
- Minnesota State Highway 109
- Minnesota State Highway 251

=== Adjacent counties ===
- Steele County - northeast
- Mower County - east
- Worth County, Iowa - south
- Winnebago County, Iowa - southwest
- Faribault County - west
- Waseca County - northwest

== Demographics ==
Historical population
Census	Pop.	Note	%±
1860	3,367		—
1870	10,578		214.2%
1880	16,069		51.9%
1890	17,962		11.8%
1900	21,838		21.6%
1910	22,282		2.0%
1920	24,692		10.8%
1930	28,741		16.4%
1940	31,780		10.6%
1950	34,517		8.6%
1960	37,891		9.8%
1970	38,064		0.5%
1980	36,329		−4.6%
1990	33,060		−9.0%
2000	32,584		−1.4%
2010	31,255		−4.1%
2020	30,895		−1.2%
2025 (est.)	30,440	▼	−1.5%
U.S. Decennial Census; 1790-1960 1900-1990; 1990-2000 2010-2020

=== Racial and ethnic composition ===
Freeborn County, Minnesota – Racial and ethnic composition Note: the US Census treats Hispanic/Latino as an ethnic category. This table excludes Latinos from the racial categories and assigns them to a separate category. Hispanics/Latinos may be of any race.
Race / Ethnicity (NH = Non-Hispanic)	Pop 1980	Pop 1990	Pop 2000	Pop 2010	Pop 2020	% 1980	% 1990	% 2000	% 2010	% 2020
White alone (NH)	35,252	31,771	30,061	27,701	25,071	97.04%	96.10%	92.26%	88.63%	81.15%
Black or African American alone (NH)	2	11	65	200	460	0.01%	0.03%	0.20%	0.64%	1.49%
Native American or Alaska Native alone (NH)	35	61	59	55	76	0.10%	0.18%	0.18%	0.18%	0.25%
Asian alone (NH)	76	126	171	232	1,135	0.21%	0.38%	0.52%	0.74%	3.67%
Native Hawaiian or Pacific Islander alone (NH)	x	x	2	10	5	x	x	0.01%	0.03%	0.02%
Other race alone (NH)	13	15	4	17	79	0.04%	0.05%	0.01%	0.05%	0.26%
Mixed race or Multiracial (NH)	x	x	173	290	886	x	x	0.53%	0.93%	2.87%
Hispanic or Latino (any race)	951	1,076	2,049	2,750	3,183	2.62%	3.25%	6.29%	8.80%	10.30%
Total	36,329	33,060	32,584	31,255	30,895	100.00%	100.00%	100.00%	100.00%	100.00%

=== 2020 census ===
As of the 2020 census, the county had a population of 30,895. The median age was 43.7 years. 22.2% of residents were under the age of 18 and 22.9% of residents were 65 years of age or older. For every 100 females there were 99.9 males, and for every 100 females age 18 and over there were 97.5 males age 18 and over.

The racial makeup of the county was 84.1% White, 1.6% Black or African American, 0.4% American Indian and Alaska Native, 3.7% Asian, <0.1% Native Hawaiian and Pacific Islander, 4.1% from some other race, and 6.0% from two or more races. Hispanic or Latino residents of any race comprised 10.3% of the population.

58.2% of residents lived in urban areas, while 41.8% lived in rural areas.

There were 13,076 households in the county, of which 26.2% had children under the age of 18 living in them. Of all households, 47.2% were married-couple households, 19.4% were households with a male householder and no spouse or partner present, and 24.8% were households with a female householder and no spouse or partner present. About 31.6% of all households were made up of individuals and 15.2% had someone living alone who was 65 years of age or older.

There were 14,114 housing units, of which 7.4% were vacant. Among occupied housing units, 75.1% were owner-occupied and 24.9% were renter-occupied. The homeowner vacancy rate was 1.4% and the rental vacancy rate was 6.9%.

=== 2000 census ===
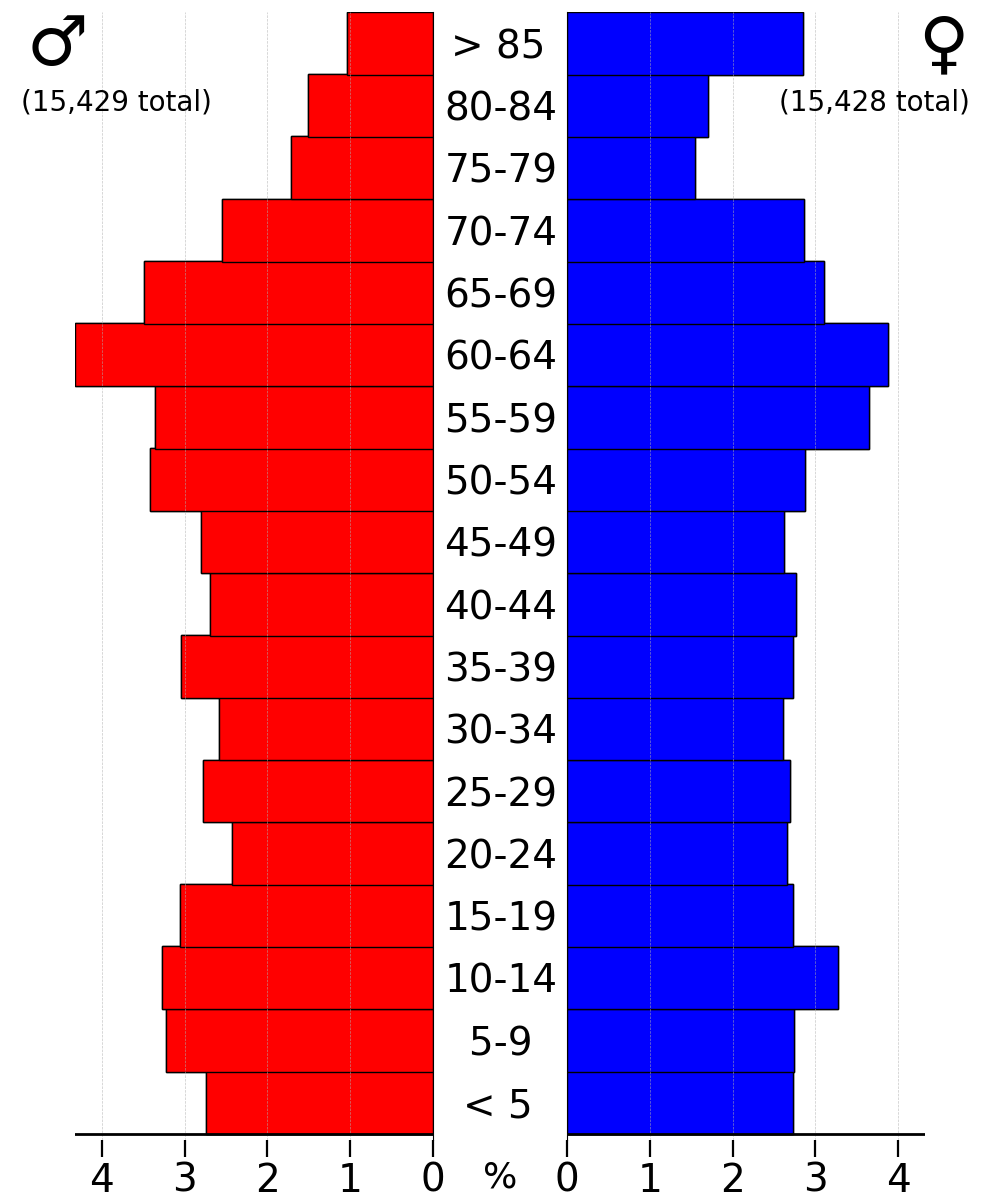
2022 US Census population pyramid for Freeborn County, from ACS 5-year estimates

As of the census of 2000, there were 32,584 people, 13,356 households, and 9,015 families in the county. The population density was 46.1 per square mile (17.8/km^{2}). There were 13,996 housing units at an average density of 19.8 per square mile (7.6/km^{2}). The racial makeup of the county was 95.22% White, 0.24% Black or African American, 0.20% Native American, 0.55% Asian, 0.02% Pacific Islander, 2.92% from other races, and 0.85% from two or more races. 6.29% of the population were Hispanic or Latino of any race. 34.8% were of Norwegian, 26.2% German and 5.8% Danish ancestry.

There were 13,356 households, of which 29.1% had children under age 18 living with them, 56.5% were married couples living together, 7.5% had a female householder with no husband present, and 32.5% were non-families. 28.2% of all households were made up of individuals, and 14.0% had someone living alone who was 65 or older. The average household size was 2.40 and the average family size was 2.92.

The county population contained 24.0% under 18, 7.5% from 18 to 24, 25.5% from 25 to 44, 24.1% from 45 to 64, and 18.9% who were 65 or older. The median age was 40. For every 100 females there were 96.6 males. For every 100 females 18 and older, there were 95.0 males.

The median income for a household in the county was $36,964, and the median income for a family was $45,142. Males had a median income of $31,491 versus $21,799 for females. The per capita income for the county was $18,325. About 5.6% of families and 8.4% of the population were below the poverty line, including 9.0% of those under 18 and 9.1% of those over 64.

== Communities ==
=== Cities ===
- Albert Lea (county seat)
- Alden
- Clarks Grove
- Conger
- Emmons
- Freeborn
- Geneva
- Glenville
- Hartland
- Hayward
- Hollandale
- Manchester
- Myrtle
- Twin Lakes

=== Unincorporated communities ===
- Armstrong
- Corning (partial)
- Gordonsville
- Mansfield
- Maple Island
- Moscow
- Oakland
- Petran

=== Townships ===
- Albert Lea Township
- Alden Township
- Bancroft Township
- Bath Township
- Carlston Township
- Freeborn Township
- Freeman Township
- Geneva Township
- Hartland Township
- Hayward Township
- London Township
- Manchester Township
- Mansfield Township
- Moscow Township
- Newry Township
- Nunda Township
- Oakland Township
- Pickerel Lake Township
- Riceland Township
- Shell Rock Township

== Government and politics ==
From 1932 to 2012, Freeborn County voted for the Democratic candidate in all but five elections, four of which were nationwide Republican landslides (1952, 1956, 1972, and 1980), and the fifth was in 1960 in one of the closest elections in American history. After voting for Bill Clinton by at least 15% in both 1992 and 1996, against George W. Bush by at least 10% in both 2000 and 2004, and for Barack Obama by at least 14% in both 2008 and 2012, the 2016 election saw a dramatic swing to the right, as Donald Trump won the county by more than 17%. Though his margin of victory slightly shrank to 16% in 2020, his vote share of nearly 57% was the best for a Republican in the county since 1928. In 2024, Trump won the county with nearly 60% of the vote and by a margin of over 21%, the largest margin of victory for a Republican presidential candidate since Herbert Hoover 1928.

United States presidential election results for Freeborn County, Minnesota
Year	Republican		Democratic		Third party(ies)	
Year	No.	%	No.	%	No.	%
1892	2,004	61.27%	743	22.71%	524	16.02%
1896	3,400	72.25%	1,179	25.05%	127	2.70%
1900	2,934	74.17%	838	21.18%	184	4.65%
1904	2,876	78.19%	461	12.53%	341	9.27%
1908	2,465	61.14%	976	24.21%	591	14.66%
1912	672	17.04%	880	22.31%	2,392	60.65%
1916	2,418	60.07%	1,347	33.47%	260	6.46%
1920	6,772	81.96%	1,131	13.69%	360	4.36%
1924	6,139	63.75%	480	4.98%	3,011	31.27%
1928	7,815	72.70%	2,859	26.60%	76	0.71%
1932	4,931	44.62%	5,838	52.82%	283	2.56%
1936	4,653	37.81%	7,378	59.96%	274	2.23%
1940	6,683	48.85%	6,942	50.75%	55	0.40%
1944	5,728	46.77%	6,486	52.96%	32	0.26%
1948	5,238	39.45%	7,825	58.94%	213	1.60%
1952	8,450	56.25%	6,525	43.44%	46	0.31%
1956	7,632	51.63%	7,138	48.29%	11	0.07%
1960	8,970	52.73%	8,018	47.14%	22	0.13%
1964	6,136	36.72%	10,554	63.16%	19	0.11%
1968	7,315	44.16%	8,671	52.35%	577	3.48%
1972	9,747	56.90%	7,163	41.82%	220	1.28%
1976	8,220	45.62%	9,470	52.56%	328	1.82%
1980	8,475	47.65%	8,212	46.17%	1,098	6.17%
1984	8,413	47.09%	9,338	52.26%	116	0.65%
1988	7,226	44.56%	8,836	54.48%	156	0.96%
1992	5,089	28.57%	7,759	43.56%	4,965	27.87%
1996	5,166	32.31%	8,458	52.90%	2,364	14.79%
2000	6,843	42.40%	8,514	52.75%	782	4.85%
2004	7,681	43.48%	9,733	55.09%	252	1.43%
2008	6,955	40.25%	9,915	57.38%	410	2.37%
2012	6,969	41.72%	9,326	55.82%	411	2.46%
2016	8,808	54.88%	6,041	37.64%	1,202	7.49%
2020	9,578	56.95%	6,889	40.96%	351	2.09%
2024	10,003	59.88%	6,448	38.60%	253	1.51%

County Board of Commissioners
Position	Name	District	Next Election
Commissioner and Chairman	Brad Edwin	District 1	2028
Commissioner	Dawn Kaasa	District 2	2026
Commissioner	Lukas Severson	District 3	2028
Commissioner	Christopher Shoff	District 4	2026
Commissioner	Nicole Eckstrom	District 5	2028

State Legislature (2025-2027)
Position	Name	Affiliation	District
Senate	Gene Dornink	Republican	23
House of Representatives	Peggy Bennett	Republican	23A
House of Representatives	Patricia Mueller	Republican	23B

U.S Congress (2025-2027)
Position	Name	Affiliation	District
House of Representatives	Brad Finstad	Republican	1st
Senate	Amy Klobuchar	Democrat	N/A
Senate	Tina Smith	Democrat	N/A

== See also ==
- National Register of Historic Places listings in Freeborn County, Minnesota
- Peter Lund Creek
