= Brooklyn Park, Minnesota =

City in Minnesota, United States

- City
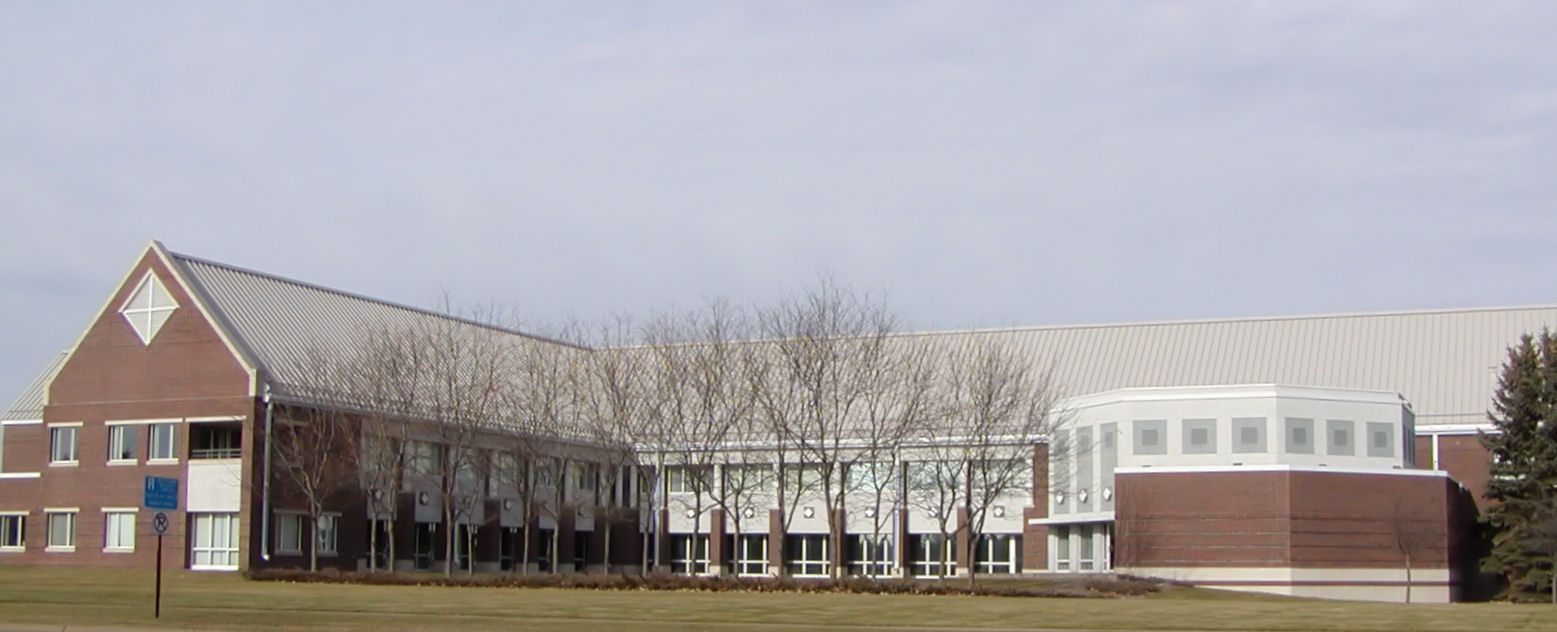
- Brooklyn Park City Hall in November 2006

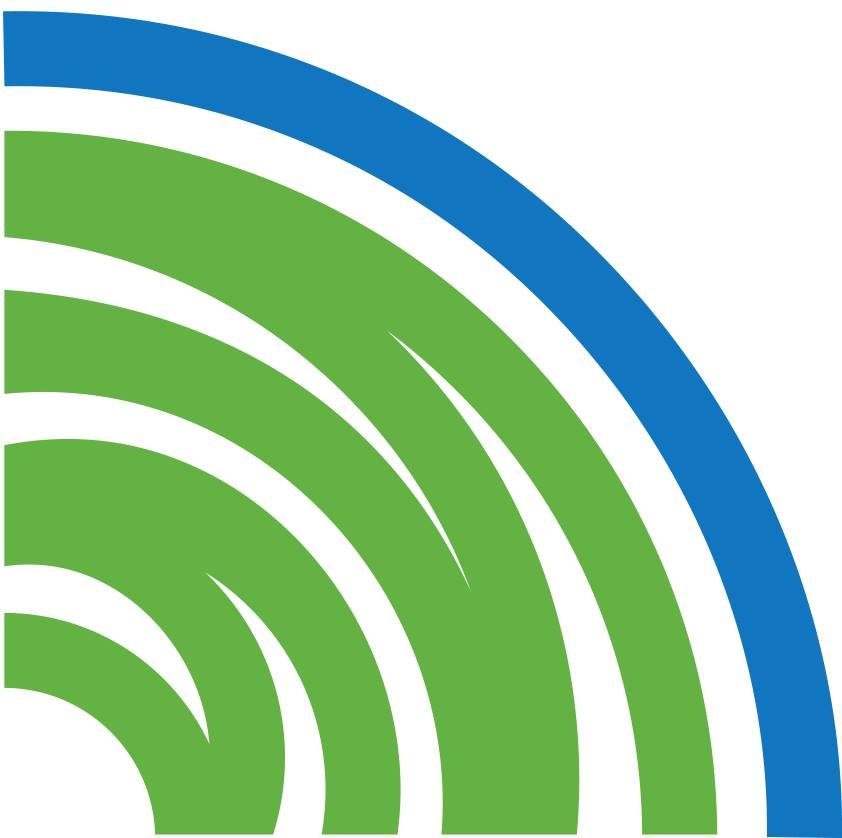
- Flag Seal

- Location of Brooklyn Park, Minnesota

- Location within Minnesota Location within the United States
- Coordinates: 45.110906°N 93.349088°W
- Country: United States
- State: Minnesota
- County: Hennepin
- Settled: 1852
- Organized: May 11, 1858
- Incorporated (village): April 14, 1954
- Incorporated (city): 1969

Government
  - Mayor: Hollies J. Winston

Area
  - City: 26.549 sq mi (68.762 km^{2})
  - Land: 26.076 sq mi (67.536 km^{2})
  - Water: 4.726 sq mi (12.240 km^{2}) 1.89%
- Elevation: 866 ft (264 m)

Population (2020)
  - City: 86,478
  - Estimate (2025): 83,543
  - Rank: US: 446th MN: 6th
  - Density: 3,177.9/sq mi (1,227.01/km^{2})
  - Urban: 2,914,866 (US: 16th)
  - Metro: 3,757,952 (US: 16th)
- Time zone: UTC−6 (Central (CST))
  - Summer (DST): UTC−5 (CDT)
- ZIP Codes: 55428, 55429, 55443, 55444, 55445
- Area code: 763
- FIPS code: 27-07966
- GNIS feature ID: 0640511
- Website: brooklynpark.org

Brooklyn Park is a suburban city on the west bank of the Mississippi River, upstream from (north of) the Twin Cities in northern Hennepin County. It is the sixth-largest city in the U.S. state of Minnesota. The population was 86,478 at the 2020 census. The city still has undeveloped land and farms, including the historic Eidem Homestead, a 1900s working farm that is a popular tourist attraction for families and school field trips. Brooklyn Park is considered both a second- and third-tier suburb of Minneapolis, because much of the land north of 85th Avenue was developed after 2000.

WWE Hall of Fame wrestler Jesse Ventura served as mayor of Brooklyn Park from 1991 to 1995. He was elected governor of Minnesota in the 1998 election on a third-party ticket and served as governor from 1999 to 2003.

Brooklyn Park is listed as a "Tree City USA" and is home to 47 miles (76 km) of trails and 67 parks, including Rush Creek Regional Trail and the northern section of Palmer Lake Park. The city is also known for Mississippi Gateway Regional Park, on the west side of Coon Rapids Dam Regional Park. Rasmussen University, North Hennepin Community College and a campus of Hennepin Technical College are in the city.

== History ==
Settlers from Michigan formally organized town government in 1858 and named the area after their hometown of Brooklyn, Michigan (in turn named after Brooklyn, New York). Formerly Brooklyn Township, the township split in 1911 when the southeast community incorporated into Brooklyn Center. Brooklyn Township was incorporated as the Village of Brooklyn Park in 1954, and incorporated as a city in 1969. In 2025 it was one of the dual epicenters of the 2025 Minnesota lawmaker shootings, which saw the assassination of DFL State Representative Melissa Hortman and her husband.

== Geography ==
According to the United States Census Bureau, the city has a total area of 26.549 square miles (68.76 km^{2}), of which 26.076 square miles (67.54 km^{2}) is land and 0.473 square miles (1.23 km^{2}), or 1.89% are water. The Mississippi River forms the eastern boundary of the city, separating it from Coon Rapids and Fridley in Anoka County.

Interstate 94 (I-94) and I-694 are located in the far southern portion of Brooklyn Park. US Highway 169 is located near the western part of the city. Minnesota State Highway 252 (MN 252), a 4.5-mile (7.2 km) north–south highway, is located near the eastern portion of the city. MN 610 runs east–west through the northern portion of Brooklyn Park. County Road 81 also serves as one of the main routes.

=== Climate ===
Brooklyn Park has a humid continental climate (Köppen: Dfa).

Climate data for Brooklyn Park
Month	Jan	Feb	Mar	Apr	May	Jun	Jul	Aug	Sep	Oct	Nov	Dec	Year
Mean daily maximum °F (°C)	23.4 (−4.8)	26.8 (−2.9)	40.8 (4.9)	55.0 (12.8)	68.0 (20.0)	78.1 (25.6)	82.6 (28.1)	79.7 (26.5)	72.7 (22.6)	57.4 (14.1)	42.3 (5.7)	27.7 (−2.4)	54.5 (12.5)
Daily mean °F (°C)	16.5 (−8.6)	19.0 (−7.2)	32.9 (0.5)	46.2 (7.9)	59.2 (15.1)	69.6 (20.9)	73.9 (23.3)	70.9 (21.6)	63.3 (17.4)	49.1 (9.5)	35.2 (1.8)	21.6 (−5.8)	46.5 (8.0)
Mean daily minimum °F (°C)	9.3 (−12.6)	10.6 (−11.9)	24.4 (−4.2)	37.4 (3.0)	50.0 (10.0)	61.0 (16.1)	65.1 (18.4)	62.2 (16.8)	54.5 (12.5)	41.4 (5.2)	28.4 (−2.0)	14.7 (−9.6)	38.2 (3.5)
Average precipitation inches (mm)	0.92 (23)	1.15 (29)	1.75 (44)	2.56 (65)	2.87 (73)	3.08 (78)	2.82 (72)	3.44 (87)	2.28 (58)	1.76 (45)	1.34 (34)	1.47 (37)	25.44 (645)
Source: Weather.Directory

== Demographics ==
Historical population
Census	Pop.	Note	%±
1860	608		—
1870	1,024		68.4%
1880	1,060		3.5%
1890	1,254		18.3%
1900	1,232		−1.8%
1910	1,268		2.9%
1920	948		−25.2%
1930	1,107		16.8%
1940	1,334		20.5%
1950	3,065		129.8%
1960	10,197		232.7%
1970	26,230		157.2%
1980	43,332		65.2%
1990	56,381		30.1%
2000	67,388		19.5%
2010	75,781		12.5%
2020	86,478		14.1%
2025 (est.)	83,543		−3.4%
U.S. Decennial Census; 2020 Census

=== Racial and ethnic composition ===
Brooklyn Park, Minnesota – racial and ethnic composition Note: the US Census treats Hispanic/Latino as an ethnic category. This table excludes Latinos from the racial categories and assigns them to a separate category. Hispanics/Latinos may be of any race.
Race / ethnicity (NH = non-Hispanic)	Pop. 1990	Pop. 2000	Pop. 2010	Pop. 2020	% 1990	% 2000	% 2010	% 2020
White alone (NH)	50,673	47,365	37,948	33,584	89.88%	70.29%	50.08%	38.84%
Black or African American alone (NH)	2,755	9,583	18,321	25,228	4.89%	14.22%	24.18%	29.17%
Native American or Alaska Native alone (NH)	339	355	313	351	0.60%	0.53%	0.41%	0.41%
Asian alone (NH)	1,913	6,193	11,658	16,261	3.39%	9.19%	15.38%	18.80%
Native Hawaiian or Pacific Islander alone (NH)	—	42	26	14	—	0.06%	0.03%	0.02%
Other race alone (NH)	51	129	215	403	0.09%	0.19%	0.28%	0.47%
Mixed race or Multiracial (NH)	—	1,777	2,459	4,048	—	2.64%	3.24%	4.68%
Hispanic or Latino (any race)	650	1,944	4,841	6,589	1.15%	2.88%	6.39%	7.62%
Total	56,381	67,388	75,781	86,478	100.00%	100.00%	100.00%	100.00%

=== Housing market ===
According to realtor website Zillow, the average price of a home as of December 31, 2025, in Brooklyn Park is $338,331.

=== 2020 census ===
As of the 2020 census, Brooklyn Park had a population of 86,478 and 28,749 households, of which 20,543 were families. The population density was 3,316.4 inhabitants per square mile (1,280.5/km^{2}). The median age was 35.0 years. 27.5% of residents were under the age of 18 and 12.2% were 65 years of age or older. For every 100 females there were 96.4 males, and for every 100 females age 18 and over there were 93.3 males age 18 and over.

100.0% of residents lived in urban areas, while 0.0% lived in rural areas.

There were 28,749 households in Brooklyn Park, of which 38.7% had children under the age of 18 living in them. Of all households, 48.4% were married-couple households, 16.9% were households with a male householder and no spouse or partner present, and 26.5% were households with a female householder and no spouse or partner present. About 22.3% of all households were made up of individuals and 8.0% had someone living alone who was 65 years of age or older.

There were 29,656 housing units, of which 3.1% were vacant. The homeowner vacancy rate was 0.6% and the rental vacancy rate was 5.5%.

Racial composition as of the 2020 census
Race	Number	Percent
White	34,304	39.7%
Black or African American	25,489	29.5%
American Indian and Alaska Native	542	0.6%
Asian	16,314	18.9%
Native Hawaiian and Other Pacific Islander	17	0.0%
Some other race	3,963	4.6%
Two or more races	5,849	6.8%
Hispanic or Latino (of any race)	6,589	7.6%

=== 2010 census ===
As of the 2010 census, there were 75,781 people, 26,229 households, and 18,763 families living in the city. The population density was 2,906.5 inhabitants per square mile (1,122.2/km^{2}). There were 27,841 housing units at an average density of 1,067.9 per square mile (412.3/km^{2}). The racial makeup of the city was 52.2% White, 24.4% African American, 0.5% Native American, 15.4% Asian, 0.1% Pacific Islander, 3.6% from other races, and 3.7% from two or more races. Hispanic or Latino people of any race were 6.4% of the population.

There were 26,229 households, of which 41.0% had children under the age of 18 living with them, 50.7% were married couples living together, 15.0% had a female householder with no husband present, 5.8% had a male householder with no wife present, and 28.5% were non-families. 22.3% of all households were made up of individuals, and 5.7% had someone living alone who was 65 years of age or older. The average household size was 2.88 and the average family size was 3.40.

The median age in the city was 32.5 years. 29% of residents were under the age of 18; 9.6% were between the ages of 18 and 24; 29.1% were from 25 to 44; 24.7% were from 45 to 64; and 7.8% were 65 years of age or older. The gender makeup of the city was 48.9% male and 51.1% female.

=== 2000 census ===
As of the 2000 census, there were 67,388 people, 24,432 households, and 17,346 families living in the city. The population density was 2,586.1 people per square mile (998.4 per km^{2}). There were 24,846 housing units at an average density of 953.5 per square mile (368.1 per km^{2}). The racial makeup of the city was 71.44% White, 14.33% African American, 0.57% Native American, 9.22% Asian, 0.07% Pacific Islander, 1.49% from other races, and 2.88% from two or more races. Hispanic or Latino people of any race totaled 4,481 residents in the city. Hispanic or Latino people of any race were 2.88% of the population.

There were 24,432 households, out of which 39.2% had children under the age of 18 living with them, 54.6% were married couples living together, 12.1% had a female householder with no husband present, and 29.0% were non-families. 22.0% of all households were made up of individuals, and 3.7% had someone living alone who was 65 years of age or older. The average household size was 2.75 and the average family size was 3.26.

In the city, the age distribution of the population showed 28.8% under the age of 18, 9.7% from 18 to 24, 34.9% from 25 to 44, 20.9% from 45 to 64, and 5.6% who were 65 years of age or older. The median age was 32 years. For every 100 females, there were 98.7 males. For every 100 females age 18 and over, there were 95.8 males.

The median household income/owner occupied was $88,972. The median household income/renter occupied was $42,541. The combined median income for a household in the city was $64,297. The per capita income for the city was $23,199. About 3.8% of families and 5.1% of the population were below the poverty line, including 6.3% of those under age 18 and 4.7% of those age 65 or over.

== Economy ==
=== Top employers ===
According to the city's 2023 Annual Comprehensive Financial Report, the largest employers in the city are:

#	Employer	# of Employees	Percentage
1	Manufacturing	8,238	24.83%
2	Health Care and Social Assistance	4,810	14.50%
3	Retail Trade	3,513	10.59%
4	Educational Services	2,820	8.50%
5	Admin and Support and Waste	1,924	5.80%
6	Accommodation and Food Services	1,661	5.01%
7	Wholesale Trade	1,564	4.71%
8	Transportation and Warehousing	1,538	4.64%
9	Professional, Scientific, and Tech	1,427	4.30%
10	Construction	1,404	4.23%
11	Other Services (except Public Admin)	1,133	3.42%
12	Finance and Insurance	866	2.61%
13	Public Administration	762	2.30%
14	Real Estate and Rental and Leasing	702	2.12%
15	Management of Companies and Enterprises	493	1.49%
16	Arts, Entertainment, and Rec	196	0.59%
17	Information	93	0.28%
18	Agriculture, Forestry, Fishing and Hunting	29	0.00%
19	Utilities	2	0.01%
20	Mining, Quarrying, and Oil and Gas	1	0.00%
—	Total employers	33,176	100.01%

== Parks and recreation ==
The Three Rivers Figure Skating Club operates out of the Brooklyn Park Community Activity Center.

== Government ==
Brooklyn Park is served by a seven-member city council, two members for each voting district within the city plus the mayor elected by the entire city. The three districts are West, East, and Central. The mayor is Hollies Winston.

Presidential election results 1960–2024

Precinct General Election Results
Year	Republican	Democratic	Third parties
2024	31.8% 12,112	65.6% 24,986	2.6% 993
2020	31.1% 12,878	66.6% 27,614	2.3% 948
2016	31.3% 11,563	61.2% 22,619	7.5% 2,757
2012	35.9% 13,546	62.4% 23,516	1.7% 642
2008	37.6% 13,497	60.9% 21,817	1.5% 538
2004	45.6% 14,789	53.4% 17,345	1.0% 320
2000	43.0% 11,572	51.0% 13,722	6.0% 1,629
1996	34.0% 8,748	54.4% 14,025	11.6% 2,998
1992	30.6% 8,880	43.4% 12,570	26.0% 7,536
1988	47.0% 11,521	53.0% 12,986	0.0% 0
1984	51.9% 11,627	48.1% 10,768	0.0% 0
1980	38.7% 7,292	50.4% 9,503	10.9% 2,068
1976	39.6% 5,931	58.2% 8,707	2.2% 326
1972	53.6% 5,712	44.3% 4,718	2.1% 218
1968	36.2% 2,633	57.4% 4,173	6.4% 464
1964	36.4% 1,809	63.5% 3,159	0.1% 6
1960	44.8% 1,913	55.0% 2,349	0.2% 9

== Education ==
Brooklyn Park is served by three school districts: Osseo Area School District 279 (the majority), Anoka-Hennepin School District 11, and Robbinsdale School District 281.

High schools serving Brooklyn Park:

- Osseo Senior High School (Osseo District)
- Park Center Senior High School (Osseo District)
- Champlin Park High School (Anoka-Hennepin District)
- Cooper Senior High School (Robbinsdale District)

Some students attend public schools in other school districts chosen by their families under Minnesota's open enrollment statute.

Maranatha Christian Academy, a private high school, and St. Vincent de Paul Parish School, a Catholic school, are also in Brooklyn Park.

Colleges include North Hennepin Community College, Hennepin Technical College and Rasmussen College.

== Notable people ==
- Casey Borer, ice hockey player for the Eisbären Berlin of the Deutsche Eishockey Liga (DEL)
- Dave Brat, former congressman from Virginia's 7th congressional district
- Emily Ford, dog musher and long-distance hiker
- Melissa Hortman (1970–2025) and her husband Mark Hortman were assassinated in Brooklyn Park
- Quinton Hooker (born 1995), basketball player in the Israeli Basketball Premier League
- Ramon Humber, linebacker for the New Orleans Saints of the National Football League; alumnus of Champlin Park High School
- Tim Jackman, professional ice hockey player; Park Center High School alumnus
- Tim Laudner, former Major League Baseball catcher for the Minnesota Twins; Park Center High School alumnus
- Dave Lindstrom, catcher Detroit Tigers Minors / Texas Tech University; Park Center High School alumnus
- Pat Neshek, relief pitcher Houston Astros; Park Center High School alumnus
- Connor Norby, Major League Baseball infielder for the Miami Marlins; born and grew up in Brooklyn Park
- Dean Nyquist, attorney and member of the Minnesota Senate
- Kirby Puckett (1960–2006), Major League Baseball center fielder who spent his entire 12-year career playing for the Minnesota Twins; early in his career, Puckett lived in Brooklyn Park, with his wife, Tonya, who is from Brooklyn Park
- Jesse Ventura, politician, actor, author, veteran, and former professional wrestler, who served as the 38th governor of Minnesota from 1999 to 2003; served as mayor of Brooklyn Park from 1991 to 1995
- Krissy Wendell, ice hockey player, former player for the United States women's national ice hockey team, also standout softball/baseball player who played in Little League World Series; Park Center High School alumna
