= Freeborn Township, Freeborn County, Minnesota =

Township in Minnesota, United States

Freeborn Township
- Township
- Location within the state of Minnesota Freeborn Township (the United States)
- Coordinates: 43°48′2″N 93°35′12″W
- Country: United States
- State: Minnesota
- County: Freeborn

Area
  - Total: 36.1 sq mi (93.5 km^{2})
  - Land: 35.6 sq mi (92.3 km^{2})
  - Water: 0.46 sq mi (1.2 km^{2})
- Elevation: 1,194 ft (364 m)

Population (2000)
  - Total: 327
  - Density: 9.1/sq mi (3.5/km^{2})
- Time zone: UTC-6 (Central (CST))
  - Summer (DST): UTC-5 (CDT)
- ZIP code: 56032
- Area code: 507
- FIPS code: 27-22544
- GNIS feature ID: 0664224

Freeborn Township is a township in Freeborn County, Minnesota, United States. The population was 327 at the 2000 census.

== History ==
Freeborn Township was organized in 1858. The township is named for William Freeborn, as is Freeborn County.

== Geography ==
According to the United States Census Bureau, the township has a total area of 36.1 square miles (93 km^{2}), of which 35.7 square miles (92 km^{2}) is land and 0.5 square miles (1.3 km^{2}) (1.27%) is water.

== Demographics ==
As of the census of 2000, there were 327 people, 121 households, and 98 families residing in the township. The population density was 9.2 inhabitants per square mile (3.6/km^{2}). There were 127 housing units at an average density of 3.6 per square mile (1.4/km^{2}). The racial makeup of the township was 99.08% White, 0.31% Asian, 0.31% from other races, and 0.31% from two or more races. Hispanic or Latino of any race were 0.31% of the population.

There were 121 households, out of which 38.8% had children under the age of 18 living with them, 68.6% were married couples living together, 5.8% had a female householder with no husband present, and 19.0% were non-families. 17.4% of all households were made up of individuals, and 6.6% had someone living alone who was 65 years of age or older. The average household size was 2.70 and the average family size was 3.03.

In the township the population was spread out, with 28.1% under the age of 18, 6.4% from 18 to 24, 28.1% from 25 to 44, 21.4% from 45 to 64, and 15.9% who were 65 years of age or older. The median age was 38 years. For every 100 females, there were 111.0 males. For every 100 females age 18 and over, there were 115.6 males.

The median income for a household in the township was $40,179, and the median income for a family was $40,938. Males had a median income of $32,813 versus $26,250 for females. The per capita income for the township was $17,882. About 4.4% of families and 3.9% of the population were below the poverty line, including 4.1% of those under age 18 and 3.8% of those age 65 or over.
