= Nunda Township, Freeborn County, Minnesota =

Township in Minnesota, United States

Nunda Township
- Township
- Location within the state of Minnesota Nunda Township (the United States)
- Coordinates: 43°32′57″N 93°27′28″W
- Country: United States
- State: Minnesota
- County: Freeborn

Area
  - Total: 34.8 sq mi (90.1 km^{2})
  - Land: 32.9 sq mi (85.2 km^{2})
  - Water: 1.9 sq mi (4.8 km^{2})
- Elevation: 1,296 ft (395 m)

Population (2000)
  - Total: 318
  - Density: 9.6/sq mi (3.7/km^{2})
- Time zone: UTC-6 (Central (CST))
  - Summer (DST): UTC-5 (CDT)
- FIPS code: 27-47608
- GNIS feature ID: 0665184

Nunda Township is a township in Freeborn County, Minnesota, United States. The population was 318 at the 2000 census.

Nunda Township was organized in 1858.

== Geography ==
According to the United States Census Bureau, the township has a total area of 34.8 square miles (90.1 km^{2}), of which 32.9 square miles (85.2 km^{2}) is land and 1.9 square miles (4.8 km^{2}) (5.35%) is water.

== Demographics ==
As of the census of 2000, there were 318 people, 132 households, and 93 families residing in the township. The population density was 9.7 people per square mile (3.7/km^{2}). There were 138 housing units at an average density of 4.2/sq mi (1.6/km^{2}). The racial makeup of the township was 96.86% White, 0.31% African American, 0.31% Native American, 0.63% Asian, 1.26% from other races, and 0.63% from two or more races. Hispanic or Latino of any race were 1.57% of the population.

There were 132 households, out of which 24.2% had children under the age of 18 living with them, 69.7% were married couples living together, and 28.8% were non-families. 25.8% of all households were made up of individuals, and 14.4% had someone living alone who was 65 years of age or older. The average household size was 2.41 and the average family size was 2.86.

In the township the population was spread out, with 22.0% under the age of 18, 5.0% from 18 to 24, 22.3% from 25 to 44, 28.9% from 45 to 64, and 21.7% who were 65 years of age or older. The median age was 45 years. For every 100 females, there were 113.4 males. For every 100 females age 18 and over, there were 117.5 males.

The median income for a household in the township was $42,917, and the median income for a family was $50,938. Males had a median income of $29,750 versus $21,750 for females. The per capita income for the township was $23,644. About 3.3% of families and 2.2% of the population were below the poverty line, including none of those under age 18 and 7.6% of those age 65 or over.
