= Shell Rock Township, Butler County, Iowa =

Township in Iowa, US

Shell Rock Township, Butler County
- Township
- Coordinates: 42°40′43″N 092°36′58″W
- Country: United States
- State: Iowa
- County: Butler

Area
  - Total: 36.46 sq mi (94.42 km^{2})
  - Land: 36.31 sq mi (94.05 km^{2})
  - Water: 0.14 sq mi (0.37 km^{2})
- Elevation: 925 ft (282 m)

Population (2020)
  - Total: 1,625
  - Density: 45/sq mi (17.2/km^{2})
- FIPS code: 19-93837
- GNIS feature ID: 0468689

Shell Rock Township is one of sixteen townships in Butler County, Iowa, United States. As of the 2020 census, its population was 1,625.

== Geography ==
Shell Rock Township covers an area of 36.45 square miles (94.4 km^{2}) and contains one incorporated settlement, Shell Rock. According to the USGS, it contains one cemetery, Riverside.
