= Shell Rock Township, Kansas =

Shell Rock Township
- Township
- Location in Greenwood County
- Coordinates: 38°06′20″N 096°00′51″W
- Country: United States
- State: Kansas
- County: Greenwood

Area
  - Total: 53.03 sq mi (137.36 km^{2})
  - Land: 52.58 sq mi (136.17 km^{2})
  - Water: 0.46 sq mi (1.19 km^{2}) 0.87%
- Elevation: 1,099 ft (335 m)

Population (2020)
  - Total: 131
  - Density: 2.49/sq mi (0.962/km^{2})
- GNIS feature ID: 0477839

Shell Rock Township is a township in Greenwood County, Kansas, United States. As of the 2020 census, its population was 131.

== Geography ==
Shell Rock Township covers an area of 53.04 square miles (137.4 km^{2}) and contains no incorporated settlements. According to the USGS, it contains one cemetery, Lena Valley.

The streams of Halderman Creek, Long Creek and Van Horn Creek run through this township.
