= Riceland Township, Freeborn County, Minnesota =

Township in Minnesota, United States

Riceland Township
- Township
- Location within the state of Minnesota Riceland Township (the United States)
- Coordinates: 43°43′28″N 93°13′9″W
- Country: United States
- State: Minnesota
- County: Freeborn

Area
  - Total: 36.1 sq mi (93.4 km^{2})
  - Land: 36.1 sq mi (93.4 km^{2})
  - Water: 0 sq mi (0.0 km^{2})
- Elevation: 1,211 ft (369 m)

Population (2000)
  - Total: 489
  - Density: 13/sq mi (5.2/km^{2})
- Time zone: UTC-6 (Central (CST))
  - Summer (DST): UTC-5 (CDT)
- FIPS code: 27-54088
- GNIS feature ID: 0665408

Riceland Township is a township in Freeborn County, Minnesota, United States. The population was 489 at the 2000 census.

== History ==
Riceland Township was organized in 1858, and named for a former lake noted for its wild rice.

== Geography ==
According to the United States Census Bureau, the township has a total area of 36.0 square miles (93.4 km^{2}), all land.

== Demographics ==
As of the census of 2000, there were 489 people, 183 households, and 148 families residing in the township. The population density was 13.6 people per square mile (5.2/km^{2}). There were 190 housing units at an average density of 5.3/sq mi (2.0/km^{2}). The racial makeup of the township was 99.59% White, and 0.41% from two or more races. Hispanic or Latino of any race were 0.61% of the population.

There were 183 households, out of which 35.0% had children under the age of 18 living with them, 70.5% were married couples living together, 4.9% had a female householder with no husband present, and 18.6% were non-families. 15.8% of all households were made up of individuals, and 7.7% had someone living alone who was 65 years of age or older. The average household size was 2.67 and the average family size was 2.97.

In the township the population was spread out, with 26.4% under the age of 18, 7.6% from 18 to 24, 24.9% from 25 to 44, 26.4% from 45 to 64, and 14.7% who were 65 years of age or older. The median age was 41 years. For every 100 females, there were 118.3 males. For every 100 females age 18 and over, there were 122.2 males.

The median income for a household in the township was $44,063, and the median income for a family was $48,036. Males had a median income of $32,708 versus $20,313 for females. The per capita income for the township was $17,884. About 6.3% of families and 8.3% of the population were below the poverty line, including 11.9% of those under age 18 and none of those age 65 or over.
