= Moscow Township, Freeborn County, Minnesota =

Township in Minnesota, United States

Moscow Township
- Township
- Location within the state of Minnesota Moscow Township (the United States)
- Coordinates: 43°43′15″N 93°7′37″W
- Country: United States
- State: Minnesota
- County: Freeborn

Area
  - Total: 36.3 sq mi (93.9 km^{2})
  - Land: 36.1 sq mi (93.5 km^{2})
  - Water: 0.12 sq mi (0.3 km^{2})
- Elevation: 1,260 ft (384 m)

Population (2000)
  - Total: 605
  - Density: 17/sq mi (6.5/km^{2})
- Time zone: UTC-6 (Central (CST))
  - Summer (DST): UTC-5 (CDT)
- FIPS code: 27-44404
- GNIS feature ID: 0665045

Moscow Township is a township in Freeborn County, Minnesota, United States. The population was 605 at the 2000 census.

Moscow Township was organized in 1858, and named after Moscow, in Russia.
