= Newry Township, Freeborn County, Minnesota =

Township in Minnesota, United States

Newry Township
- Township
- Location within the state of Minnesota Newry Township (the United States)
- Coordinates: 43°47′38″N 93°6′36″W
- Country: United States
- State: Minnesota
- County: Freeborn

Area
  - Total: 36.1 sq mi (93.5 km^{2})
  - Land: 36.1 sq mi (93.5 km^{2})
  - Water: 0 sq mi (0.0 km^{2})
- Elevation: 1,270 ft (387 m)

Population (2000)
  - Total: 500
  - Density: 14/sq mi (5.4/km^{2})
- Time zone: UTC-6 (Central (CST))
  - Summer (DST): UTC-5 (CDT)
- FIPS code: 27-45934
- GNIS feature ID: 0665111

Newry Township is a town located in Freeborn County, Minnesota, United States. The population was about 500 at the 2000 census.

Newry Township was organized in 1858, and named after the town of Newry in Ireland, the native home of several first settlers.

== Geography ==
According to the United States Census Bureau, the township has a total area of 36.1 square miles (93.4 km^{2}), all land.

== Demographics ==
As of the census of 2000, there were 500 people, 176 households, and 146 families residing in the township. The population density was 13.9 people per square mile (5.4/km^{2}). There were 189 housing units at an average density of 5.2/sq mi (2.0/km^{2}). The racial makeup of the township was 95.60% White, 0.20% Asian, 3.00% from other races, and 1.20% from two or more races. 3.20% of the population is Hispanic or Latino.

37.5% of all the households have children under the age of 18 living with them, 74.4% were married couples living together, 4.0% had a female householder with no husband present, and 17.0% were non-families. 13.1% of all households were made up of individuals, and 5.1% had someone living alone with an age of 65 years or older. The average household size was 2.84 and the average family size was 3.13.

The population was spread out in the town, with 27.8% under the age of 18, 7.6% from 18 to 24, 27.6% from 25 to 44, 23.8% from 45 to 64, and 13.2% who were 65 years of age or older. The median age was 38 years. For every 100 females, there were 106.6 males. For every 100 females age 18 and over, there were 111.1 males.

The median income for a household within the area was $47,321, and the median income for a family was $47,596. Males had a median income of $33,611 versus $20,000 for females. The per capita income for the township was $18,151. 2.6% of the population were living below the poverty line, including no under eighteens and 2.7% of those over 64.
