= Shell Rock Township, Freeborn County, Minnesota =

Township in Minnesota, United States

Shell Rock Township
- Township
- Location within the state of Minnesota Shell Rock Township (the United States)
- Coordinates: 43°33′3″N 93°14′22″W
- Country: United States
- State: Minnesota
- County: Freeborn

Area
  - Total: 33.7 sq mi (87.3 km^{2})
  - Land: 33.7 sq mi (87.3 km^{2})
  - Water: 0 sq mi (0.0 km^{2})
- Elevation: 1,280 ft (390 m)

Population (2000)
  - Total: 430
  - Density: 13/sq mi (4.9/km^{2})
- Time zone: UTC-6 (Central (CST))
  - Summer (DST): UTC-5 (CDT)
- FIPS code: 27-59548
- GNIS feature ID: 0665590

Shell Rock Township is a township in Freeborn County, Minnesota, United States. The population was 430 at the 2000 census.

Shell Rock Township was organized in 1857, and named after the Shell Rock River.

== Geography ==
According to the United States Census Bureau, the township has a total area of 33.7 square miles (87.3 km^{2}), of which 33.7 square miles (87.3 km^{2}) is land and 0.03% is water.

== Demographics ==
As of the census of 2000, there were 430 people, 183 households, and 127 families residing in the township. The population density was 12.8 people per square mile (4.9/km^{2}). There were 201 housing units at an average density of 6.0/sq mi (2.3/km^{2}). The racial makeup of the township was 99.07% White, 0.23% Asian, 0.47% from other races, and 0.23% from two or more races. Hispanic or Latino of any race were 2.09% of the population.

There were 183 households, out of which 30.1% had children under the age of 18 living with them, 60.7% were married couples living together, 3.3% had a female householder with no husband present, and 30.6% were non-families. 26.8% of all households were made up of individuals, and 13.7% had someone living alone who was 65 years of age or older. The average household size was 2.35 and the average family size was 2.87.

In the township the population was spread out, with 21.6% under the age of 18, 7.0% from 18 to 24, 24.0% from 25 to 44, 30.9% from 45 to 64, and 16.5% who were 65 years of age or older. The median age was 44 years. For every 100 females, there were 121.6 males. For every 100 females age 18 and over, there were 118.8 males.

The median income for a household in the township was $39,219, and the median income for a family was $42,321. Males had a median income of $27,125 versus $24,464 for females. The per capita income for the township was $18,867. About 4.9% of families and 5.5% of the population were below the poverty line, including 5.7% of those under age 18 and 3.2% of those age 65 or over.
