= Minnesota Correctional Facility – Red Wing =

Prison in Minnesota, United States

Minnesota Correctional Facility – Red Wing (MCF-Red Wing)
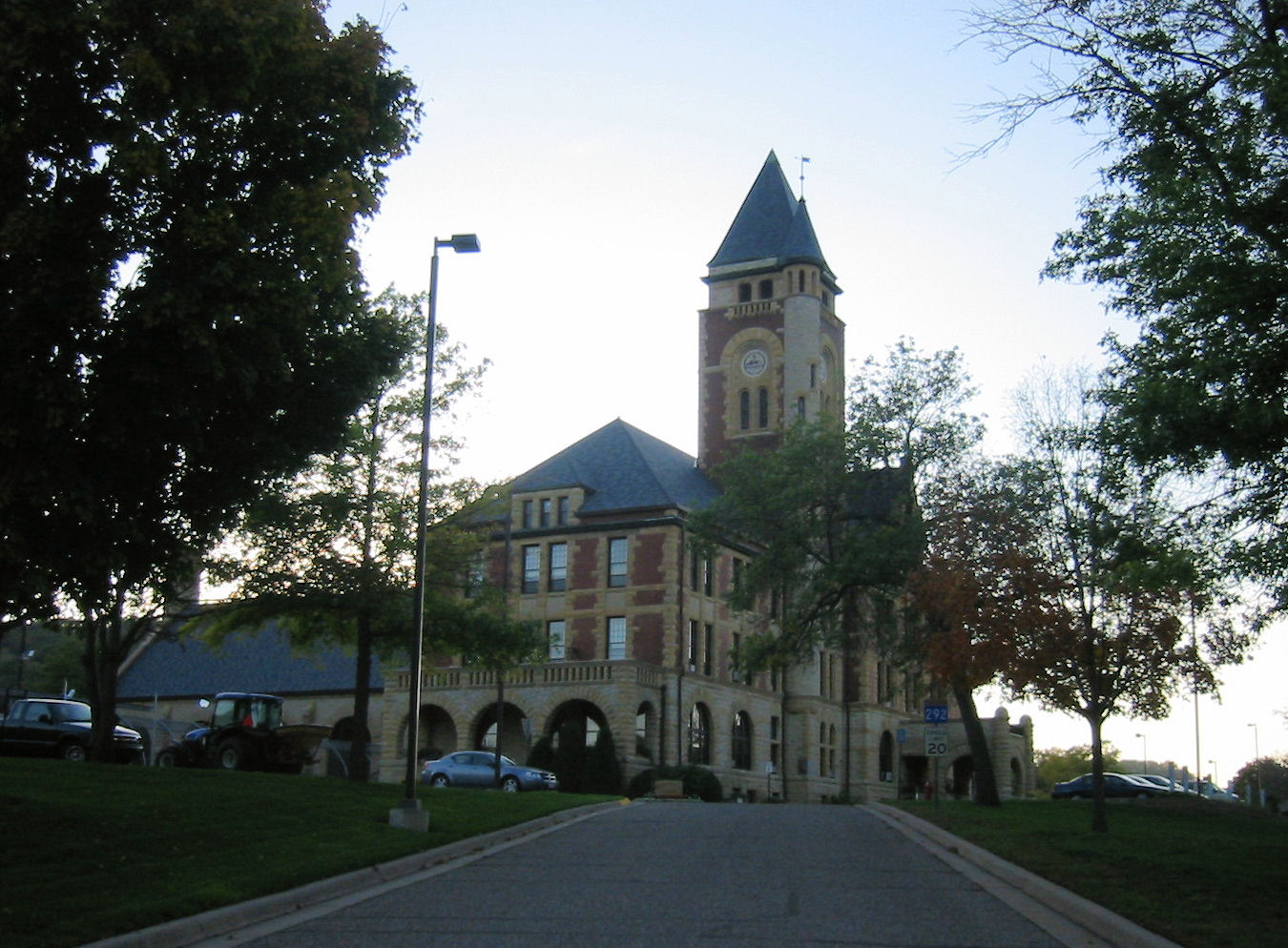
- Interactive map of Minnesota Correctional Facility – Red Wing (MCF-Red Wing)
- Location: Red Wing, Minnesota; 44.561°N 92.497°W
- Status: Operational
- Security class: juvenile & minimum-security adult reentry
- Capacity: 219 (juvenile male) & 42 (adult)
- Population: 111 (juvenile male) & 42 (adult) (2010-07-01)
- Opened: 1889
- Managed by: Minnesota Department of Corrections
- Warden: Shon Thieren

- Minnesota State Training School
- U.S. National Register of Historic Places
- Location within Minnesota
- Location: Red Wing, Minnesota
- Coordinates: 44.561°N 92.497°W
- Architect: Warren B. Dunnell
- Architectural style: Romanesque
- NRHP reference No.: 73000979

The Minnesota Correctional Facility – Red Wing is a state juvenile correctional facility located in Red Wing, Minnesota, US. As of July 2010, it housed 111 juvenile males, operating at about half of its licensed capacity. The prison also houses over 40 adult male prisoners in minimum-security, reentry housing.

== History ==
Built in 1889 as the Minnesota State Training School, the original Romanesque building was designed by Warren B. Dunnell, the architect of a number of historical public buildings in Minnesota, including the Minnesota State Public School for Dependent and Neglected Children, the Fergus Falls State Hospital Complex, the Minnesota Soldiers' Home Historic District, and the Pillsbury Academy Campus Historic District.

American serial killer, rapist, arsonist, robber, and burglar Carl Panzram (June 28, 1891 – September 5, 1930) alleges that he was repeatedly beaten, tortured, and raped by Red Wing staff members while he was incarcerated here between the ages of 11 and 13.

During the COVID-19 pandemic, a Red Wing staff member was one of the first two confirmed cases of the virus in the Minnesota prison system.

== Cultural references ==
The institution served as the subject of Walls of Red Wing, a folk and protest song by American singer-songwriter Bob Dylan.
