= Owatonna Firemen's Hall =

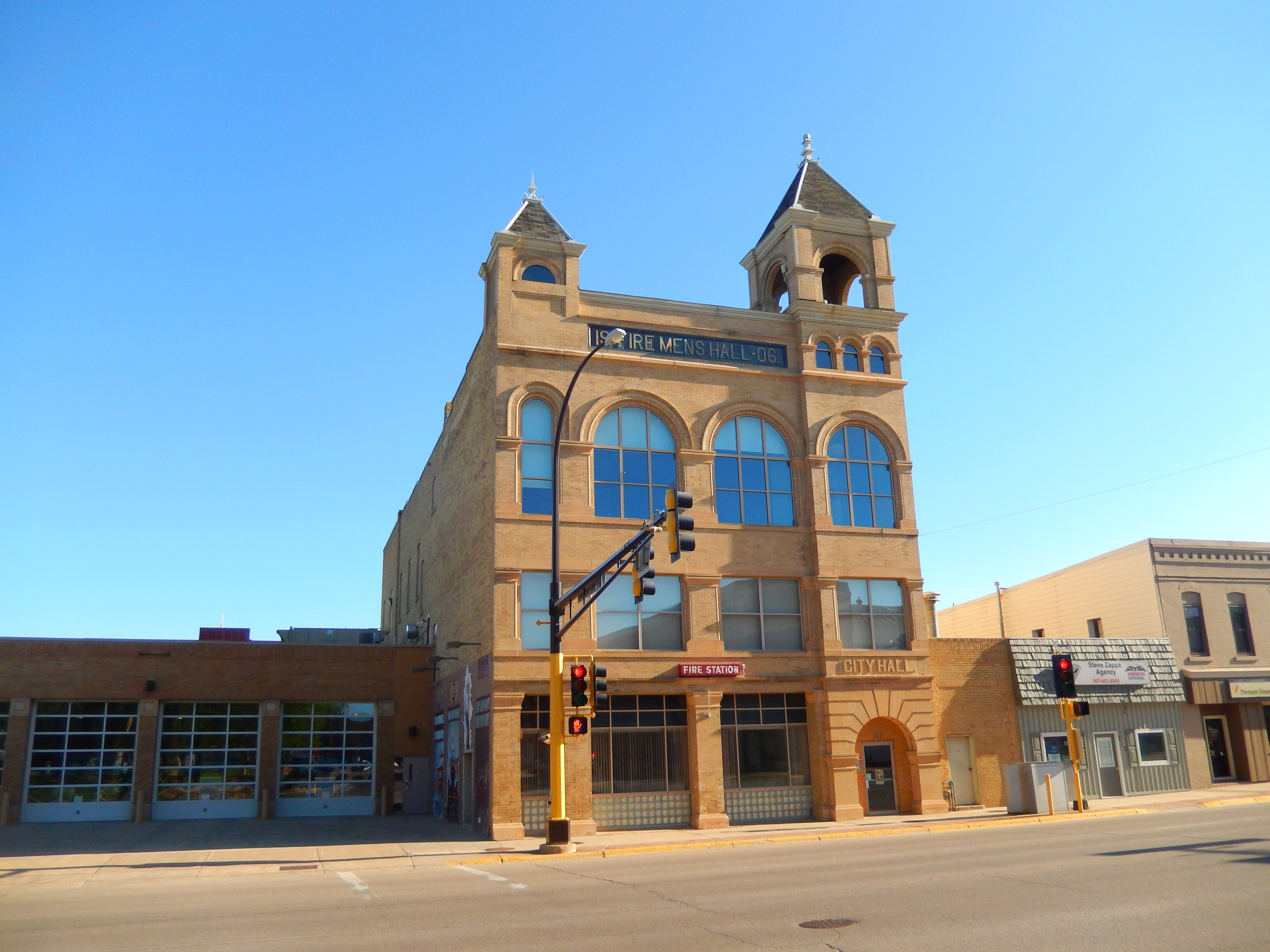
- The Owatonna Firemen's Hall and garage from the north-northeast

- Location within Minnesota Location within the United States
- Former names: Owatonna City and Firemen's Hall

General information
- Status: Fire station
- Architectural style: Romanesque Revival
- Location: Owatonna, Minnesota, 107 Main Street West, United States
- Coordinates: 44°5′1″N 93°13′35.5″W
- Construction started: 1906
- Opened: October 5, 1907
- Renovated: 1996
- Cost: $19,643.00
- Owner: City of Owatonna

Technical details
- Floor count: 3

Design and construction
- Architect: William F. Keefe
- Main contractor: Hammel Brothers and Anderson
- Owatonna City and Firemen's Hall
- U.S. National Register of Historic Places
- U.S. Historic district – Contributing property
- Part of: Owatonna Commercial Historic District (ID14001237)
- NRHP reference No.: 97000019

Significant dates
- Added to NRHP: January 31, 1997
- Designated CP: February 2, 2015

Owatonna Fire Department

Agency overview
- Established: 1875
- Fire chief: Ed Hoffman
- Motto: To save lives and property in a safe and efficient manner

Facilities and equipment
- Stations: 1
- Engines: 4
- Trucks: 51
- Tenders: 2

Website
- http://www.ci.owatonna.mn.us/fire/

The Owatonna Firemen's Hall, formerly the Owatonna City and Firemen's Hall, is a historic government building in Owatonna, Minnesota, United States. It was built from 1906 to 1907 to house the Owatonna Fire Department and city government offices. The city offices were relocated to the former campus of the Minnesota State Public School for Dependent and Neglected Children in 1974. The Firemen's Hall continues to serve as the headquarters for the Owatonna Fire Department.

The Firemen's Hall building was listed on the National Register of Historic Places in 1997 for having local significance in the themes of architecture and politics/government. It was nominated for serving as the government center and a key public facility in Owatonna, and for exemplifying the municipal buildings often built in late-19th/early-20th-century Minnesota. In 2015 the Firemen's Hall was also listed as a contributing property to the Owatonna Commercial Historic District.

== History ==
In September 1903 the city's fire department bought two lots, 44 feet (13 m) wide by 132 feet (40 m) long, west of the Metropolitan Opera House (later the Roxy Theatre) for $3,126.00 (equivalent to $112,015 in 2025). On September 19, 1905, a special election was held to gauge support from Owatonna residents for a $15,000.00 bond for the construction of a new city hall and fire station. The bond was passed. On July 17, 1906, the construction firm Hammel and Anderson, with a bid of $19,643.00, was awarded the contract for construction of the fire hall. On August 17 the two lots were donated to the city by the firemen for construction of a combination city hall and fire hall on the condition that the city would spend not less than $15,000.00 for construction of a three-story building. The firemen contributed $1,000 towards capital costs and obtained a 25-year lease. The cornerstone was laid on September 8, 1906. An opening ceremony was held on October 5, 1907 and the equipment was transferred to the new site, the same year, on November 5. The team used horse-drawn equipment until 1915, when the first motorized vehicle, a 1915 Jeffery, was purchased.

Early-20th-century view of the City and Firemen's Hall adjacent to the Metropolitan Opera House (left)

The city vacated their portion of the building in 1974, moving to the new West Hills campus on the site of the former state orphanage. A truck bay was built where the old Roxy Theatre stood, which was demolished in the 1950s, along with other improvements to the building, done in the 1996 renovation. An elevator was installed and the third floor remodeled in 2008.

In February 2016 the City of Owatonna purchased two lots for $184,000 on the corner of 24th Street and Kenyon Road, in northeastern Owatonna, for the future development of a fire sub-station. The northern section of Owatonna is about 1.5 miles (2.4 km) from the current Firemen's Hall, which has led to longer response times. The city intended to wait for further development before any building is done. The time before any building occurs is estimated at 10 years.

=== Fire department chiefs ===
- 1875 – 1879: M. R. Srong
- 1879 – 1884: H. Randal
- 1884 – 1885: S. S. Green
- 1886 – 1887: E. M. Twiford
- 1888 – 1892: C. E. Luce
- 1892 – 1895: F. G. Schuman
- 1895 – 1898: E. M. Twiford
- 1899 – 1900: O. Wood
- 1901 – 1919: E. M. Twiford
- 1919 – 1927: F. G. Schuman
- 1927 – 1933: Andrew Erdman
- 1933 – 1942: A. C. Smith
- 1942 – 1972: Ed Slazak
- 1972 – 1987: Frank Anderson
- 1987 – 1988: Paul Illg
- 1988 – 2001: Jerry Rosenthal
- 2001 – 2022: Mike Johnson
- 2022-Present: Ed Hoffman

== Other uses ==
The Owatonna Firemen's Hall is also the headquarters for Steele County Skywarn, a non-profit weather spotting organization. Locally, it is a part of Steele County Emergency Management. It uses the third floor for meetings and another room in the building as a nerve center, to communicate with spotters out in the field, monitor weather conditions in and around Owatonna, and make reports to the National Weather Service in Chanhassen, Minnesota.

== See also ==
- List of fire stations
- National Register of Historic Places listings in Steele County, Minnesota
