= Blooming Prairie, Minnesota =

City in Minnesota, United States

Blooming Prairie
- City
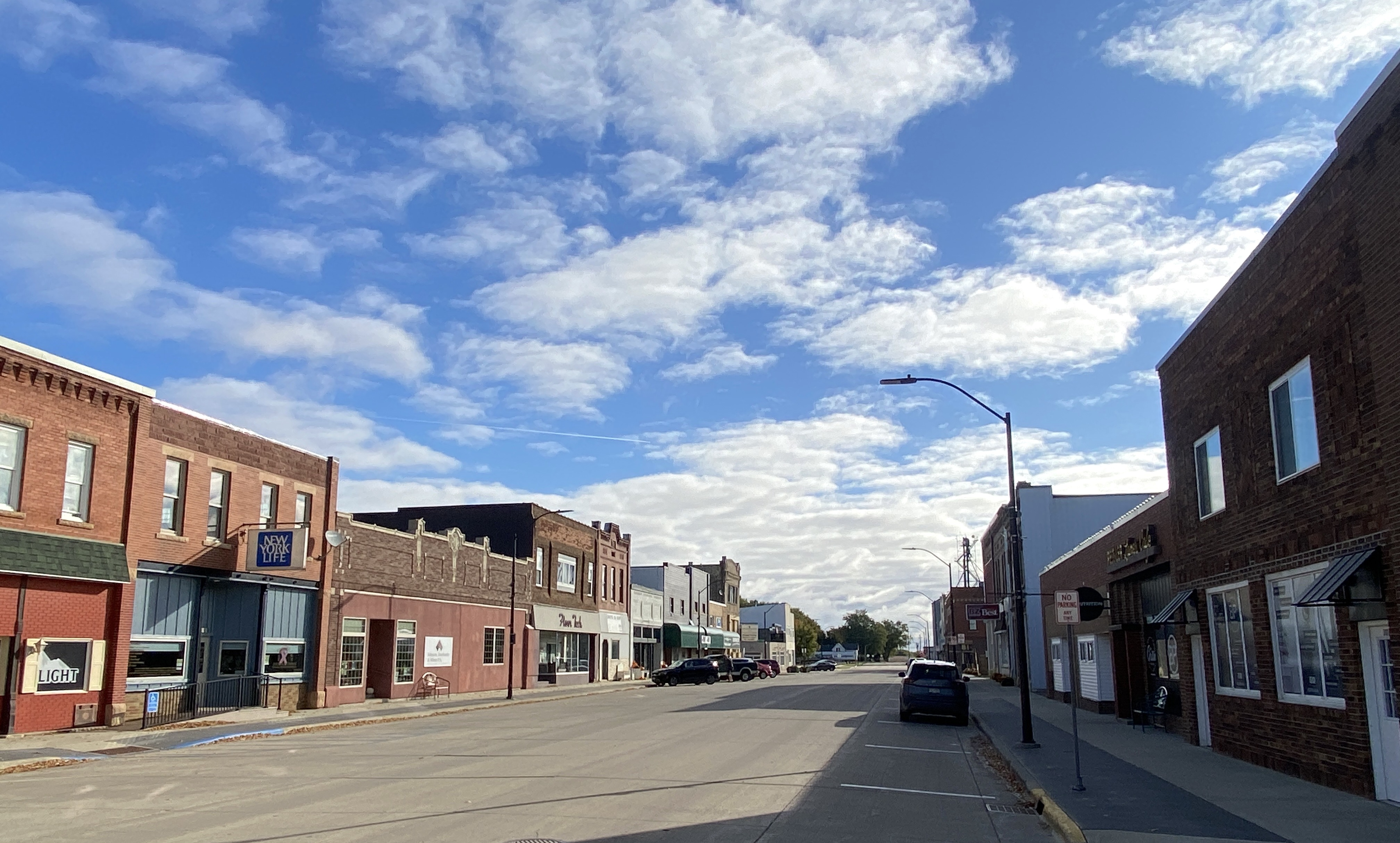
- The Blooming Prairie Commercial Historic District is listed on the National Register of Historic Places.

- Location of Blooming Prairie within Steele and Dodge counties in the state of Minnesota
- Coordinates: 43°52′06″N 93°03′20″W
- Country: United States
- State: Minnesota
- Counties: Steele, Dodge

Area
  - Total: 1.36 sq mi (3.52 km^{2})
  - Land: 1.36 sq mi (3.52 km^{2})
  - Water: 0 sq mi (0.00 km^{2})
- Elevation: 1,296 ft (395 m)

Population (2020)
  - Total: 1,974
  - Density: 1,451/sq mi (560.3/km^{2})
- Time zone: UTC-6 (Central (CST))
  - Summer (DST): UTC-5 (CDT)
- ZIP code: 55917
- Area code: 507
- FIPS code: 27-06580
- GNIS feature ID: 2394195
- Website: https://bloomingprairiemn.gov/

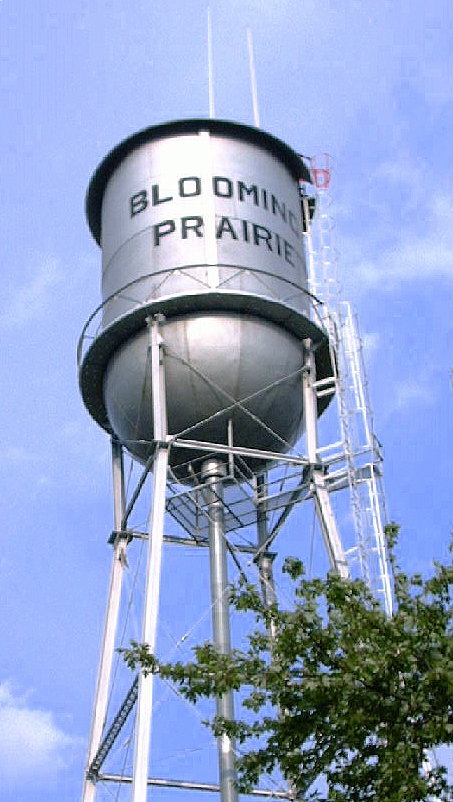
Blooming Prairie's original water tower. It was brought down in September 2024.

Blooming Prairie is a city in Dodge and Steele counties in the U.S. state of Minnesota. The population was 1,974 at the 2020 census. Most of the city is located within Steele County; only a small part of the city extends into Dodge County.

== History ==
Blooming Prairie was settled in 1856 and organized in 1867, being then called Oak Glen. The township received its present name in January 1873, taking the name of its railway village, which was platted in 1868. It is euphonious, referring to the abundant flowers of this prairie region, and it has the merit of uniqueness, with no other village or post office in the world having adopted this name.

A post office has been in operation at Blooming Prairie since 1868. The city was incorporated by 1874. Blooming Prairie's historic downtown is listed on the National Register of Historic Places.

Before the Prohibition Act came into effect, Blooming Prairie's presence near the intersection of Mower, Freeborn, Dodge, and Steele county made it a lucrative hub for the sale of alcohol. Circa 1917, Steele County was the only one of the four to be considered "wet", meaning that it was legal not only to own and consume alcohol, like in "dry" counties, but also to sell it. During the Prohibition Act, several tunnels were dug under the businesses on Main Street for the purpose of making and peddling moonshine, according to many of the residents of Blooming Prairie.

During the late 1990s, small independent farmers left or signed contracts with Big Ag. Grazing livestock disappeared as the hegemony of factory farms began. As time went on with increasing environmental impact from ever-increasing hog CAFO's fights over factory farms divided the town. Both farmers and academics have faced harrassement and retaliation for opposing Big Ag either in lawsuits or writing critically about agricultural pollution; some were pushed into resignation.

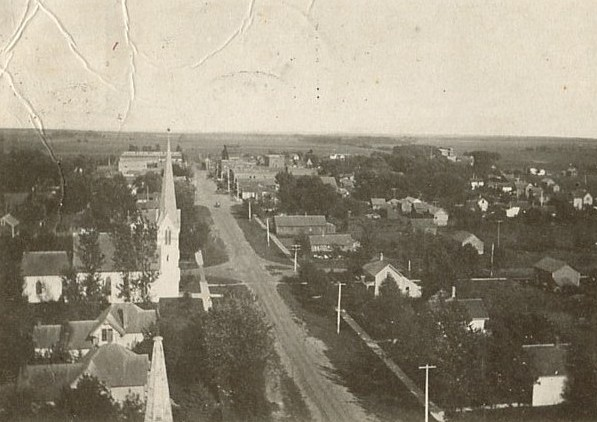
Blooming Prairie c. 1905

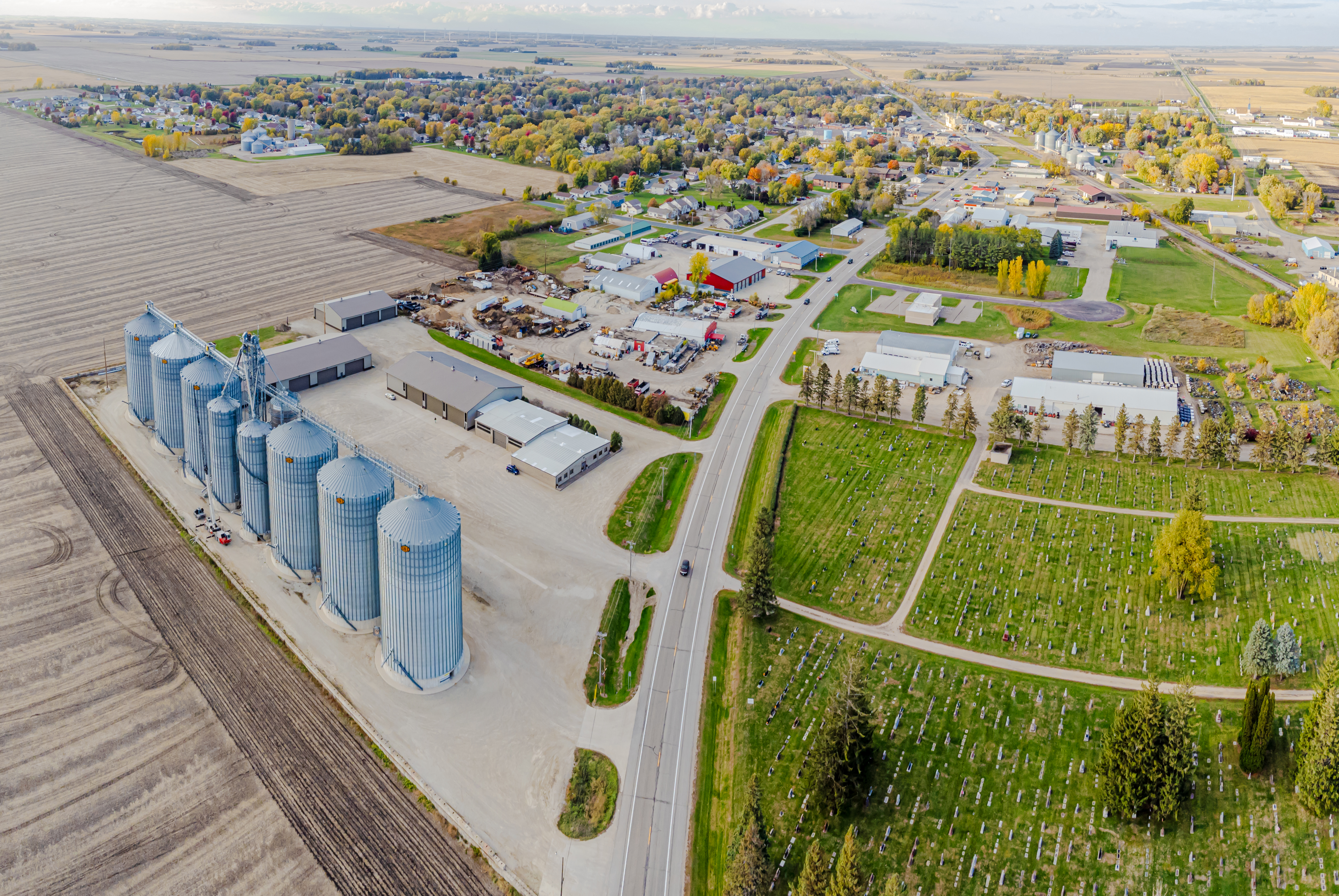
US-218 going through

== Geography ==
According to the United States Census Bureau, the city has a total area of 1.41 square miles (3.65 km^{2}), all land.

U.S. Highway 218 and Minnesota State Highway 30 are the main routes in the city.

== Demographics ==
Historical population
Census	Pop.	Note	%±
1880	338		—
1890	808		139.1%
1900	855		5.8%
1910	854		−0.1%
1920	1,012		18.5%
1930	1,046		3.4%
1940	1,205		15.2%
1950	1,442		19.7%
1960	1,778		23.3%
1970	1,804		1.5%
1980	1,969		9.1%
1990	2,043		3.8%
2000	1,933		−5.4%
2010	1,996		3.3%
2020	1,974		−1.1%
U.S. Decennial Census

=== 2020 census ===
As of the 2020 census, Blooming Prairie had a population of 1,974. The median age was 39.7 years. 25.8% of residents were under the age of 18 and 22.7% of residents were 65 years of age or older. For every 100 females there were 93.3 males, and for every 100 females age 18 and over there were 90.4 males age 18 and over.

0.0% of residents lived in urban areas, while 100.0% lived in rural areas.

There were 794 households in Blooming Prairie, of which 31.7% had children under the age of 18 living in them. Of all households, 49.1% were married-couple households, 16.8% were households with a male householder and no spouse or partner present, and 25.8% were households with a female householder and no spouse or partner present. About 32.0% of all households were made up of individuals and 16.0% had someone living alone who was 65 years of age or older.

There were 842 housing units, of which 5.7% were vacant. The homeowner vacancy rate was 0.9% and the rental vacancy rate was 6.0%.

Racial composition as of the 2020 census
Race	Number	Percent
White	1,780	90.2%
Black or African American	8	0.4%
American Indian and Alaska Native	6	0.3%
Asian	6	0.3%
Native Hawaiian and Other Pacific Islander	0	0.0%
Some other race	49	2.5%
Two or more races	125	6.3%
Hispanic or Latino (of any race)	136	6.9%

=== 2010 census ===
As of the census of 2010, there were 1,996 people, 802 households, and 535 families living in the city. The population density was 1,415.6 inhabitants per square mile (546.6/km^{2}). There were 864 housing units at an average density of 612.8 per square mile (236.6/km^{2}). The racial makeup of the city was 97.1% White, 0.4% African American, 0.3% Native American, 0.4% Asian, 0.6% from other races, and 1.3% from two or more races. Hispanic or Latino of any race were 6.3% of the population.

There were 802 households, of which 32.2% had children under the age of 18 living with them, 52.9% were married couples living together, 9.6% had a female householder with no husband present, 4.2% had a male householder with no wife present, and 33.3% were non-families. 28.6% of all households were made up of individuals, and 16.3% had someone living alone who was 65 years of age or older. The average household size was 2.42 and the average family size was 2.92.

The median age in the city was 40.5 years. 25.9% of residents were under the age of 18; 5.8% were between the ages of 18 and 24; 23.1% were from 25 to 44; 24.3% were from 45 to 64; and 21.2% were 65 years of age or older. The gender makeup of the city was 48.9% male and 51.1% female.

=== 2000 census ===
As of the census of 2000, there were 1,933 people, 748 households, and 504 families living in the city. The population density was 1,428.4 inhabitants per square mile (551.5/km^{2}). There were 774 housing units at an average density of 572.0 per square mile (220.9/km^{2}). The racial makeup of the city was 96.43% White, 0.21% African American, 0.21% Native American, 0.36% Asian, 2.48% from other races, and 0.31% from two or more races. Hispanic or Latino of any race were 4.91% of the population.

Of the 748 households, 30.9% had children under the age of 18 living with them, 57.8% were married couples living together, 5.5% had a female householder with no husband present, and 32.5% were non-families. 28.2% of all households were made up of individuals, and 16.6% had someone living alone who was 65 years of age or older. The average household size was 2.46 and the average family size was 3.02.

In the city, the population was spread out, with 25.7% under the age of 18, 7.5% from 18 to 24, 23.5% from 25 to 44, 20.2% from 45 to 64, and 23.0% who were 65 years of age or older. The median age was 40 years. For every 100 females, there were 88.0 males. For every 100 females age 18 and over, there were 88.0 males.

The median income for a household in the city was $40,345, and the median income for a family was $51,118. Males had a median income of $34,911 versus $21,705 for females. The per capita income for the city was $19,343. About 2.8% of families and 6.6% of the population were below the poverty line, including 6.1% of those under age 18 and 9.8% of those age 65 or over.

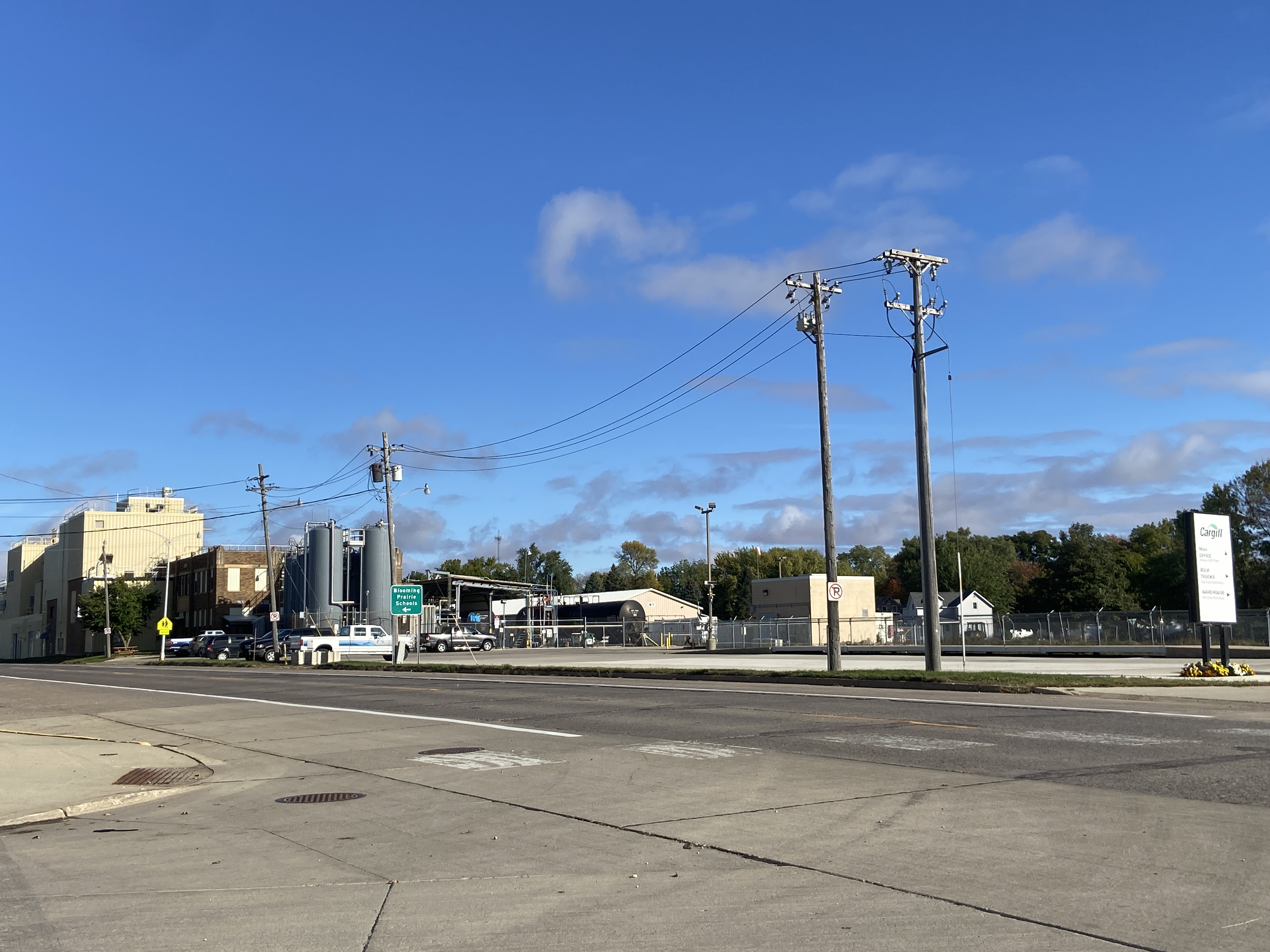
Cargill facilities

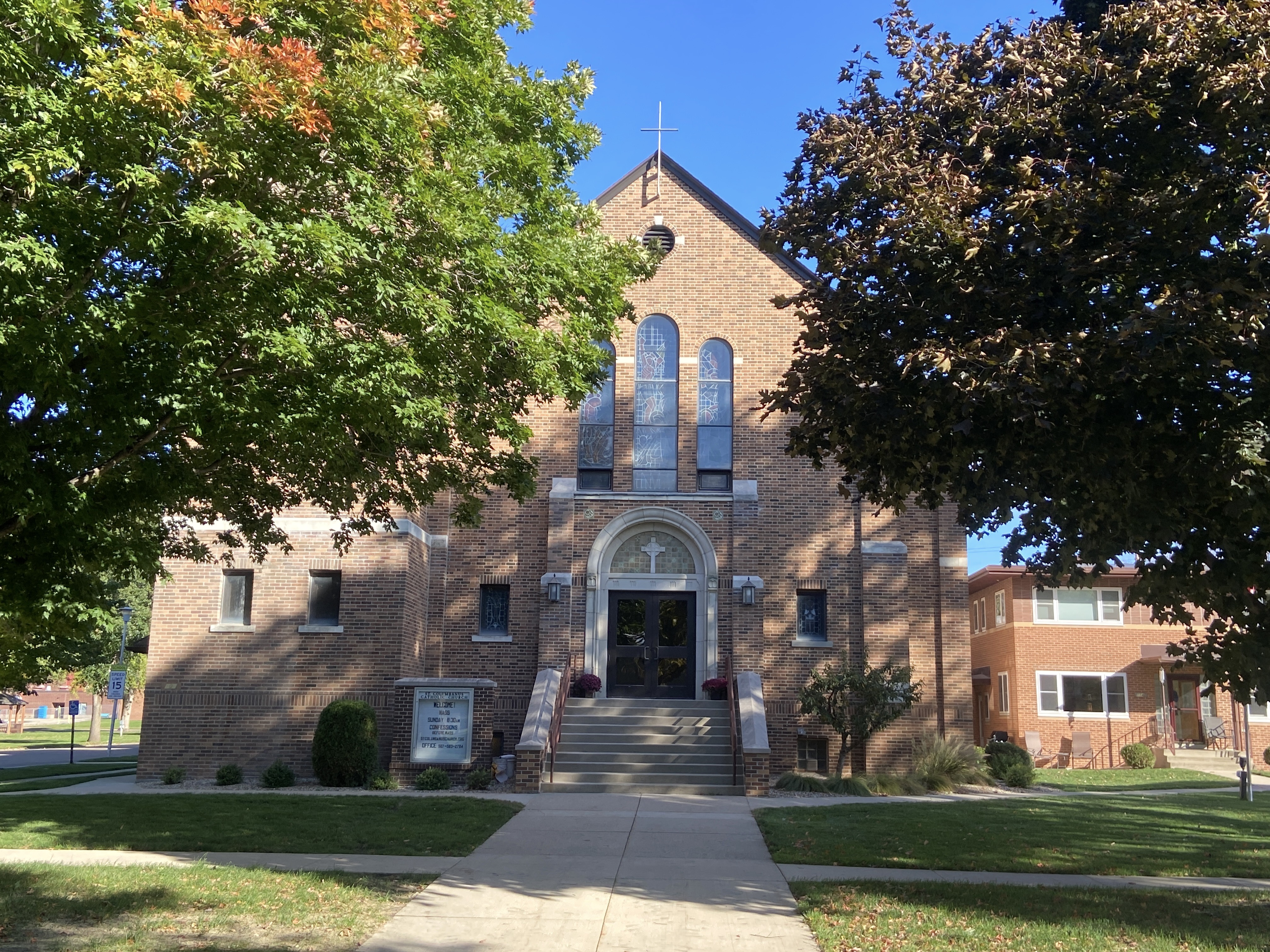
St. Columbanus Catholic Church

== Notable people ==
- Josh Braaten, television and motion picture actor
- John George Lennon (1858-1919), Minnesota state legislator and businessman
- Samuel A. Rask (1874-1959), Minnesota state senator and businessman

== See also ==
- Blooming Prairie High School
