= Steele County Courthouse (Minnesota) =

- U.S. National Register of Historic Places
- U.S. Historic district – Contributing property
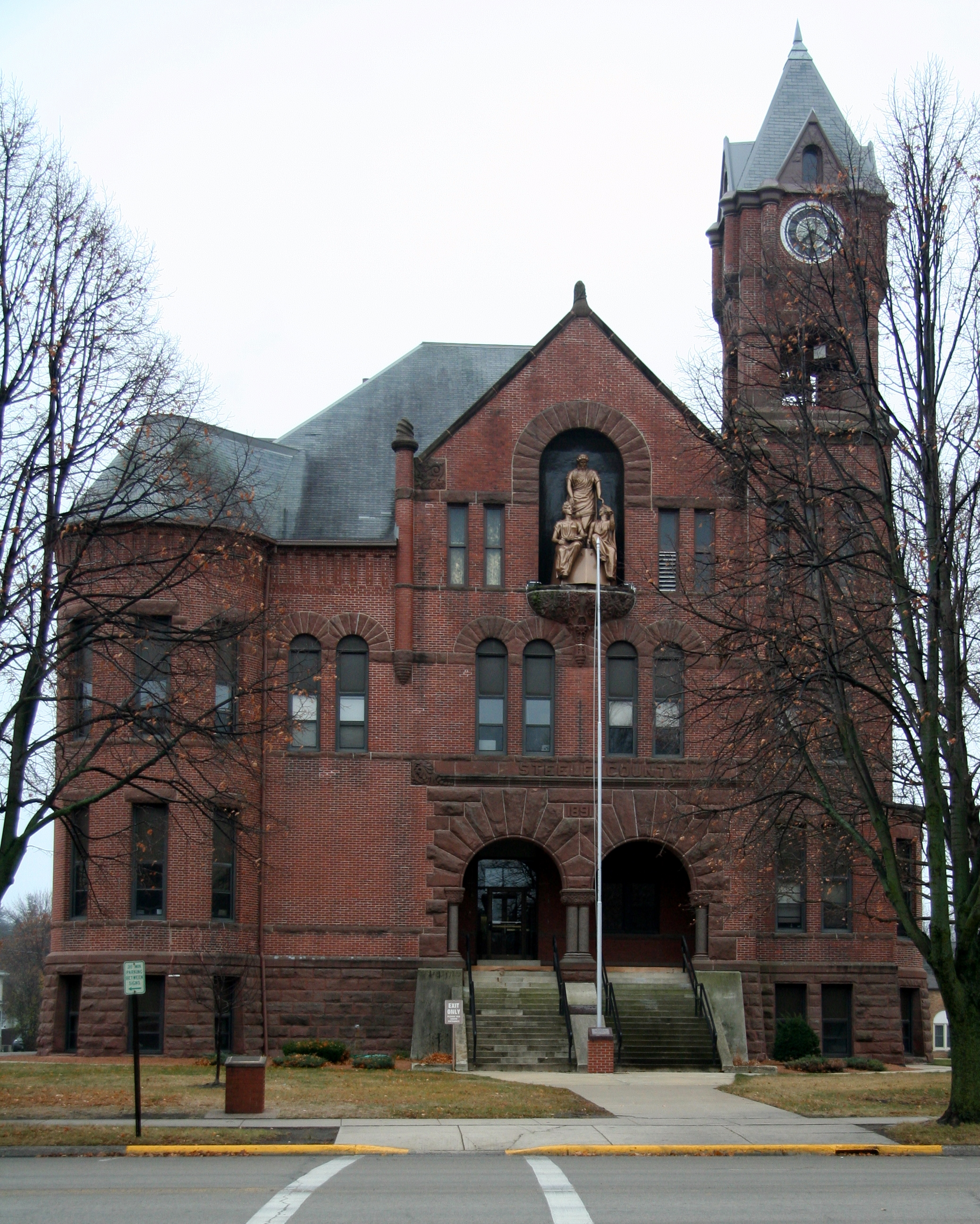
- The Steele County Courthouse from the north

- Location within Minnesota Location within the United States
- Interactive map showing the location of Steele County Courthouse
- Location: 111 East Main Street, Owatonna, Minnesota
- Coordinates: 44°5′0″N 93°13′31.5″W
- Area: Less than two acres
- Built: 1891
- Built by: Leck & McLeod
- Architect: T. Dudley Allen
- Architectural style: Romanesque Revival
- Part of: Owatonna Commercial Historic District (ID14001237)
- NRHP reference No.: 76001076

Significant dates
- Added to NRHP: June 3, 1976
- Designated CP: February 2, 2015

The Steele County Courthouse is the seat of government for Steele County, located in Owatonna, Minnesota, United States. It was built in 1891. The courthouse is a three-story Austin red-brick building with red mortar, accented with Lake Superior brown stone. It was designed by T. Dudley Allen of Minneapolis in a Romanesque Revival and Italianate style, featuring corner towers, a turret, and a large clock on four sides. Windows are arched and a statue representing Mercy, Law, and Justice sits above the north face of the building. Polished granite columns support double arches at the entrances. The interior is decorated with wainscoting, woodwork, and an ornate oak staircase. The courthouse was listed on the National Register of Historic Places in 1976 for having local significance in the themes of architecture and politics/government. It was nominated for its Romanesque Revival architecture and long service as Steele County's government seat.

Steele County's previous county courthouse, built in 1874, was also listed on the National Register but was demolished in 1987 and removed from the register. The current courthouse is also a contributing property to the Owatonna Commercial Historic District.

== See also ==
- List of county courthouses in Minnesota
- National Register of Historic Places listings in Steele County, Minnesota
