= Owatonna Public Library =

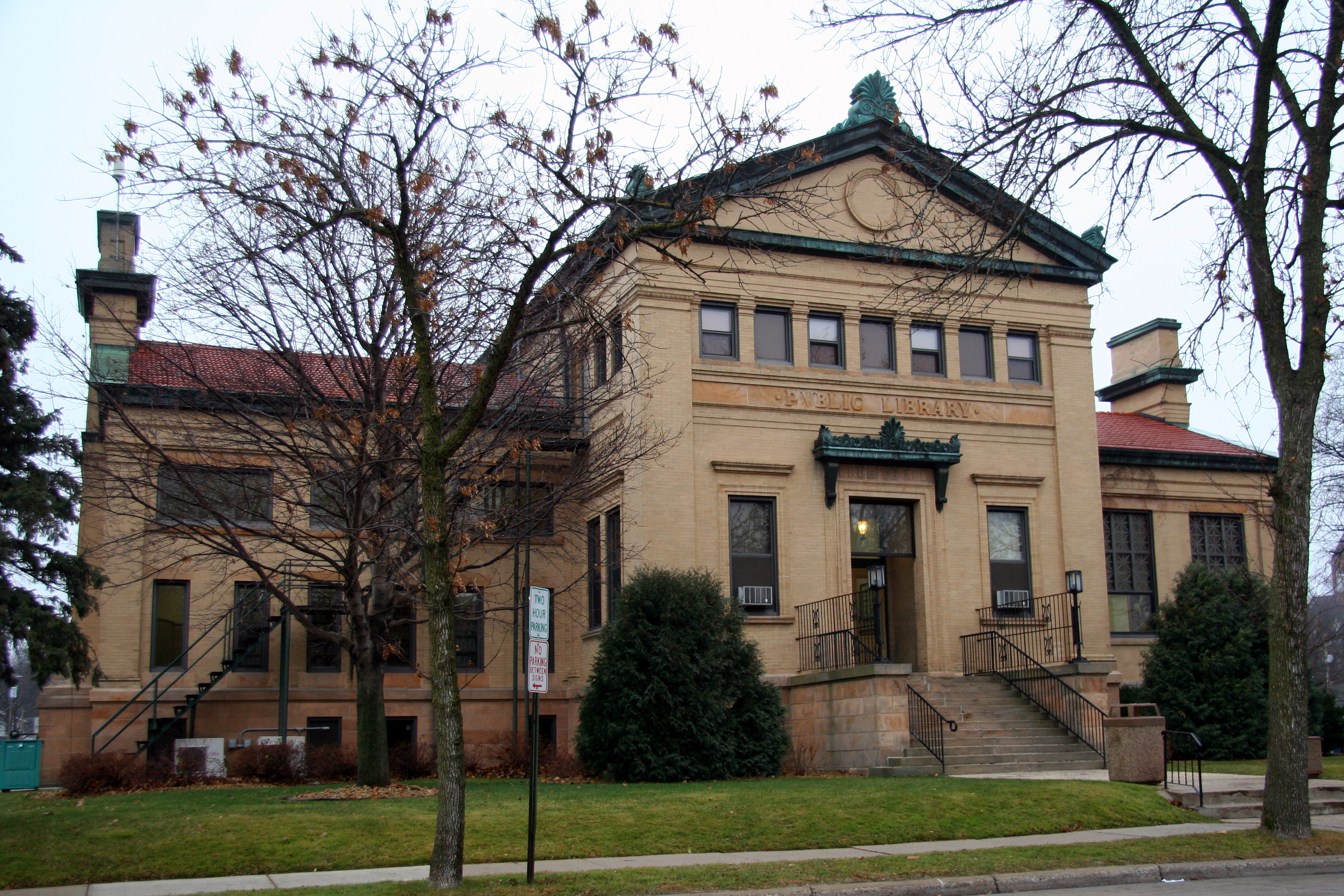
- The Owatonna Public Library from the east-northeast
- 44°5′6.5″N 93°13′23″W
- Location: 105 North Elm Avenue, Owatonna, Minnesota
- Established: 1896

Other information
- Director: Mark L. Blando
- Website: http://ci.owatonna.mn.us/library
- Owatonna Free Public Library
- U.S. National Register of Historic Places
- Area: Less than two acres
- Built: 1899–1900
- Built by: Hammel & Anderson
- Architect: Frank A. Gutterson
- Architectural style: Neoclassical
- NRHP reference No.: 76001075
- Added to NRHP: June 7, 1976

The Owatonna Public Library is a public library in Owatonna, Minnesota, United States. It was established in 1896 and is housed in a building completed in 1900. It is a member of Southeastern Libraries Cooperating (SELCO), the regional public library system for Southeast Minnesota.

== History ==
Owatonna's public library was established in 1896 by a legacy donation of $5,000 (equivalent to $193,500 in 2025) from an Owatonna citizen. Votes passed in 1898 and 1899 to provide public funds for the construction of a dedicated library building. Frank A. Gutterson of Smith and Gutterson—an architectural firm based in Des Moines, Iowa—designed a two-story, cruciform facility in Neoclassical style. Construction began in 1899 and the library building was officially dedicated on February 22, 1900.

The Owatonna Public Library building was listed on the National Register of Historic Places in 1976 as the Owatonna Free Public Library for having local significance in the themes of architecture and education. It was nominated for its Neoclassical architecture and contributions to Owatonna's intellectual and cultural development.

== See also ==
- National Register of Historic Places listings in Steele County, Minnesota
