= Dr. John H. Adair House =

Historic house in Minnesota, United States

- U.S. National Register of Historic Places
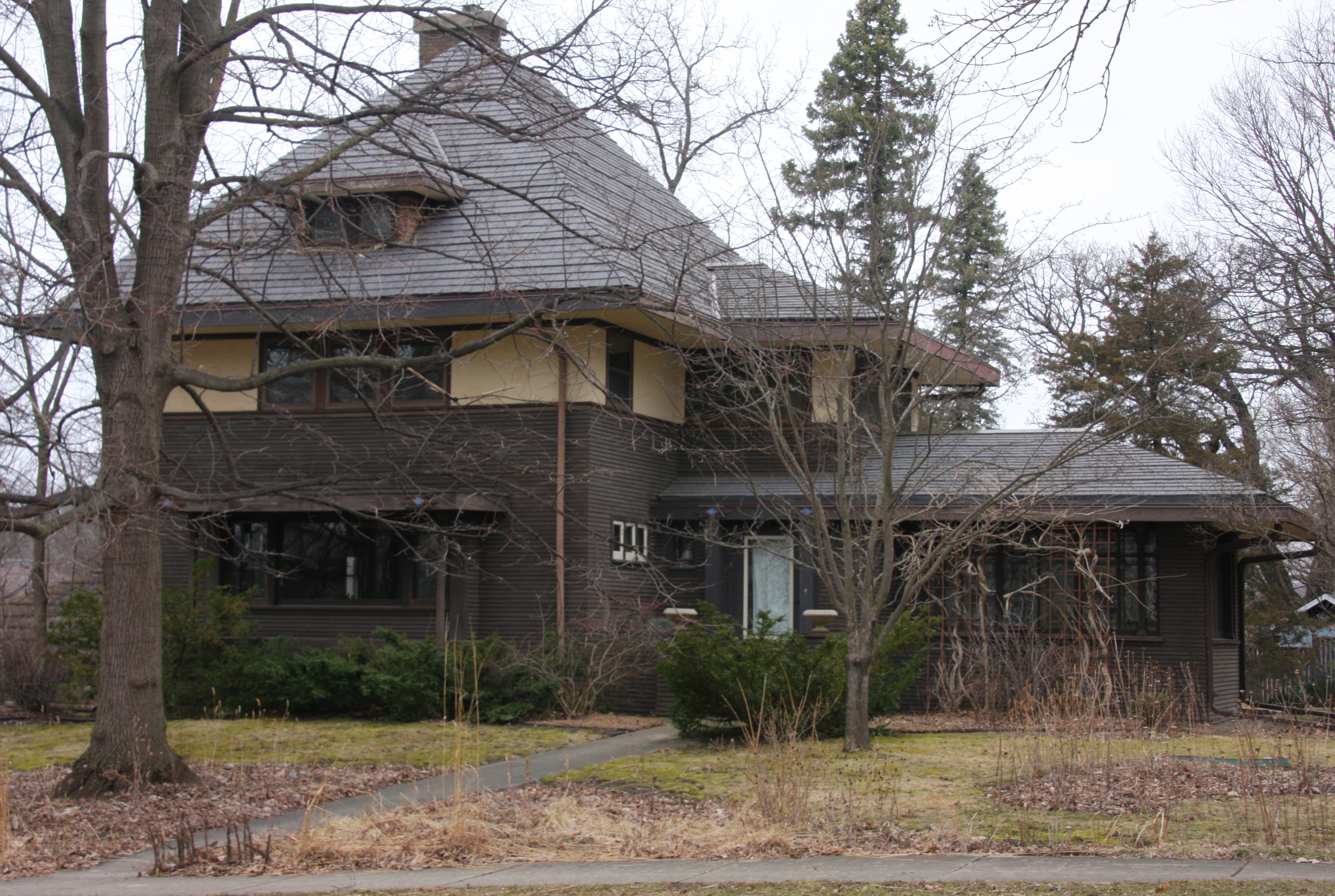
- The Dr. John H. Adair House viewed from the south

- Location within Minnesota Location within the United States
- Location: 322 East Vine Street, Owatonna, Minnesota
- Coordinates: 44°5′9.8″N 93°13′12″W
- Area: Less than one acre
- Built: 1913
- Architect: Purcell, Feick & Elmslie
- Architectural style: Prairie School, American Foursquare
- NRHP reference No.: 86001406
- Added to NRHP: July 3, 1986

The Dr. John H. Adair House is a historic house in Owatonna, Minnesota, United States. Built in 1913, it was designed by architects Purcell, Feick & Elmslie in Prairie School style patterned onto American Foursquare massing. The house was listed on the National Register of Historic Places in 1986 for having local significance in the theme of architecture. It was nominated for being a leading example of Purcell, Feick & Elmslie's residential commissions in Southeast Minnesota, and for being Steele County's most outstanding Prairie School building.

== History ==
Dr. John H. Adair was introduced to Purcell and Elmslie by Charles Buxton, whose own Purcell and Elmslie-designed house was a few blocks away. The original proposal was for one of their traditional low-slung houses, but Adair found the proposed house to be too expensive. Purcell decided to raise the roof, later saying, "One can always see how I was always yearning for buildings with tall steep roofs and turned to that form whenever the occasion offered." The house has some resemblance to the Edward R. Hills House designed by Frank Lloyd Wright in Oak Park, Illinois, with three stories, stepped-back hipped roofs, and bedrooms in the attic. The interior features generously sized rooms with built-in furnishing, art glass, and decorations in Elmslie's diamond motif. The fireplace has a semicircular opening with blue and gold glass mosaic accents, inspired by the nearby National Farmers Bank of Owatonna.

== See also ==
- National Register of Historic Places listings in Steele County, Minnesota
