= Owatonna Commercial Historic District =

Historic district in Minnesota, United States

- U.S. National Register of Historic Places
- U.S. Historic district
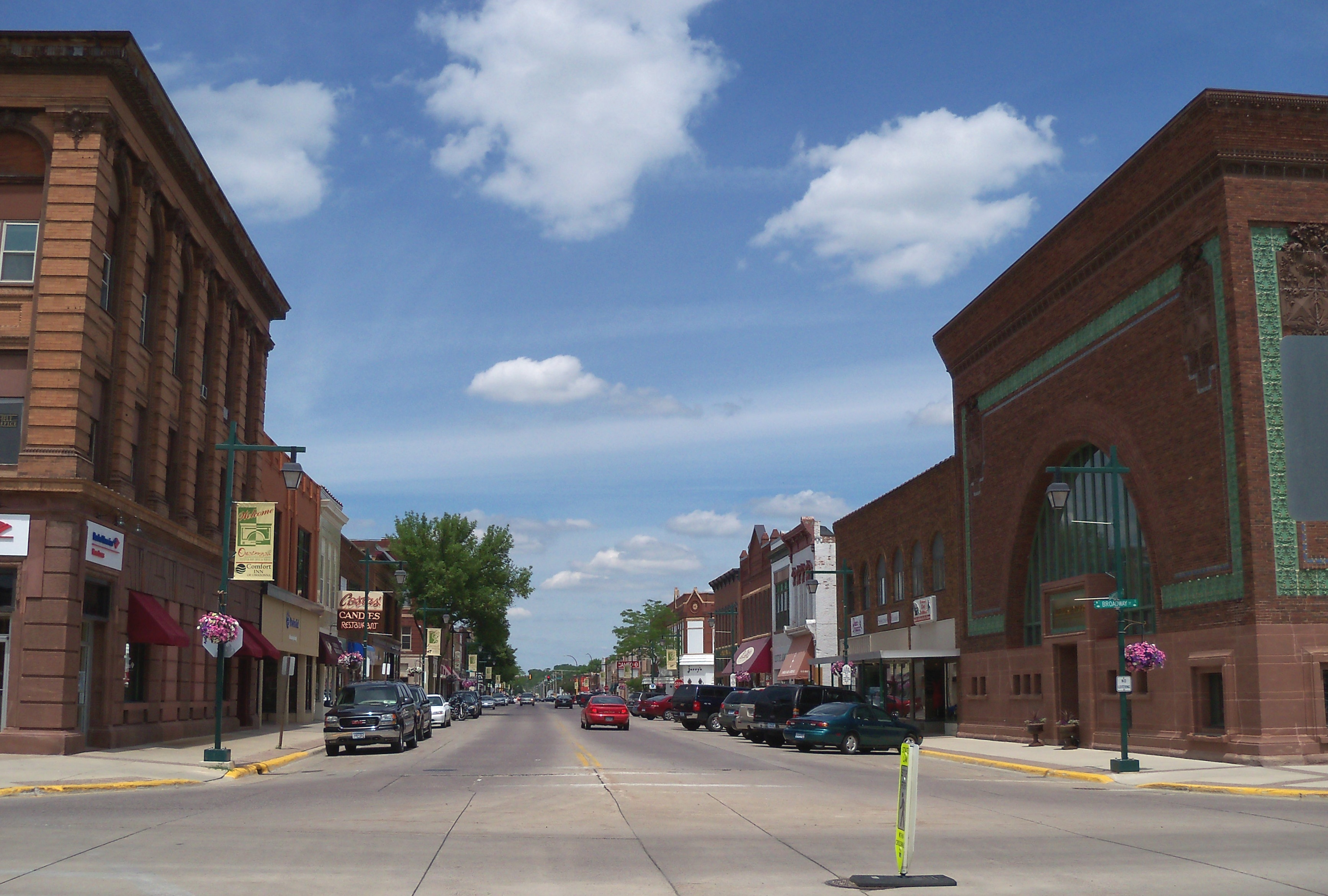
- View up Cedar Avenue from Broadway Street

- Location within Minnesota Location within the United States
- Location: Roughly bounded by North Cedar Avenue, West & East Broadway, West Bridge & West Main Streets, Owatonna, Minnesota
- Coordinates: 44°5′3″N 93°13′33″W
- Area: 21 acres (8.5 ha)
- Built: 1871–1950s
- Built by: Hammel Brothers and Anderson
- Architect: Louis Sullivan, Frank A. Gutterson, Long and Long, Olof Hanson, T. Dudley Allen, William Keefe
- Architectural style: Italianate, Romanesque Revival, Neoclassical, Commercial style, Sullivanesque
- NRHP reference No.: 14001237
- Added to NRHP: February 2, 2015

The Owatonna Commercial Historic District is a designation applied to the historic downtown of Owatonna, Minnesota, United States. It comprises 75 contributing properties mostly built between 1871 and the late 1950s. It was listed as a historic district on the National Register of Historic Places in 2015 for having local significance in the theme of commerce. It was nominated for its associations with the growth and prosperity of an agricultural/industrial community and county seat.

The Owatonna Commercial Historic District comprises portions of 12 city blocks. Owatonna's Central Park, established in 1871, forms the focal point of the district. The park is bordered by three buildings that were previously listed on the National Register as individual properties: the 1891 Steele County Courthouse, the 1907 Owatonna City and Firemen's Hall, and the 1908 National Farmer's Bank. A total of 74 buildings and one site (Central Park) are considered contributing properties to the district, while 13 buildings and two sites within the boundaries are considered non-contributing.

== See also ==
- National Register of Historic Places listings in Steele County, Minnesota
