= Pillsbury Baptist Bible College =

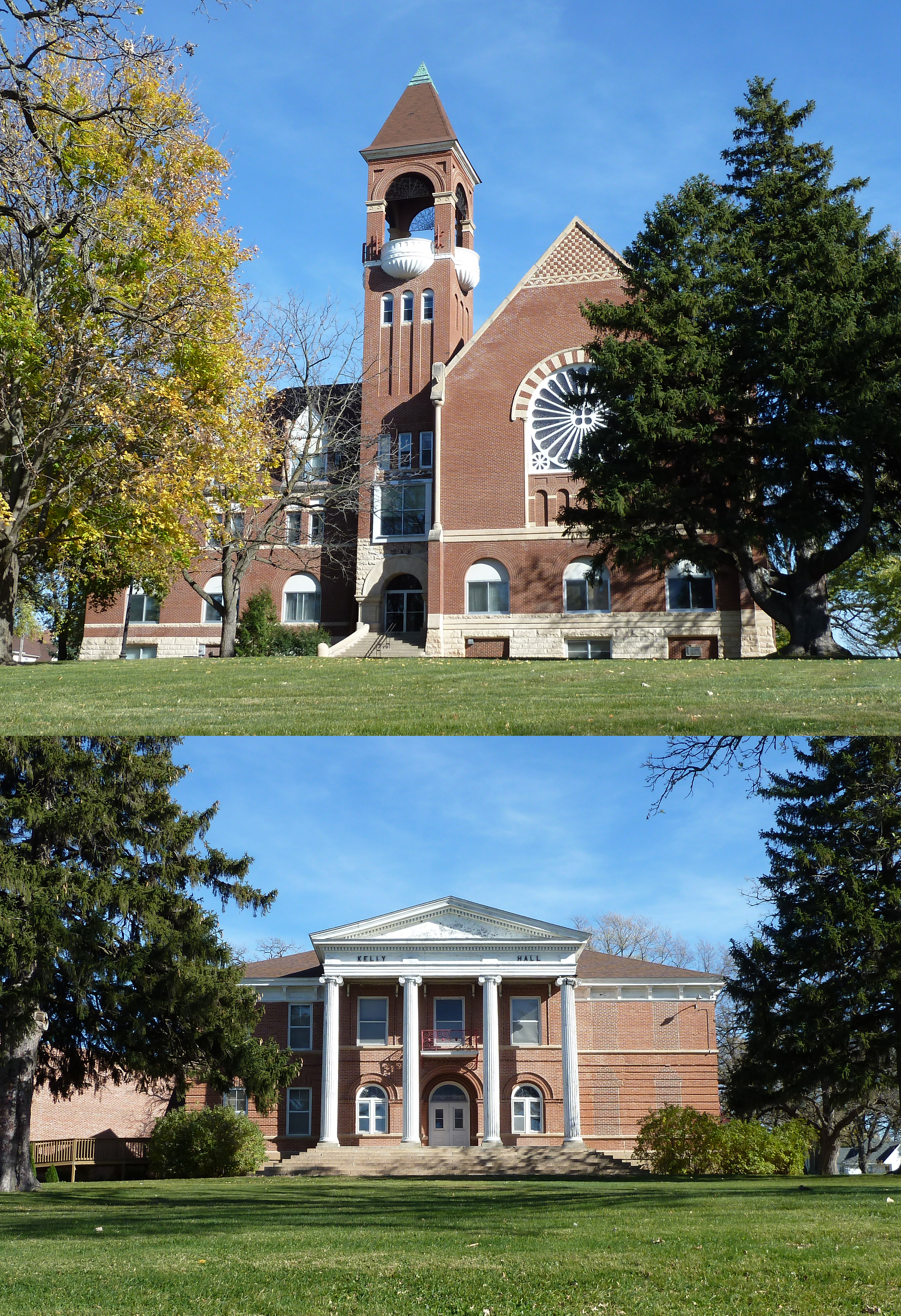
- Old Main (top) and Kelly Hall (bottom) at Pillsbury Baptist Bible College
- Former name: Pillsbury Academy (1886–1957)
- Type: Private
- Active: 1957–December 31, 2008
- Religious affiliation: Independent Baptist
- Undergraduates: 800
- Location: Owatonna, Minnesota, United States; 44°4′57″N 93°13′6″W
- Campus: Small town
- Nickname: Comets
- Sporting affiliations: Upper Midwest Athletic Conference
- Pillsbury Academy Campus Historic District
- U.S. National Register of Historic Places
- U.S. Historic district
- Location within Minnesota Location within the United States
- Location: Roughly Academy, Grove, and Main Sts.
- Coordinates: 44°4′56″N 93°13′20″W
- Area: 8.75 acres (3.54 ha)
- Built: 1889–1914
- Architect: J. Anderson (Old Main), Warren Dunnell (Music Hall)
- Architectural style: Romanesque Revival, Neoclassical
- NRHP reference No.: 86003680 (original); 100006560 (increase)

Significant dates
- Added to NRHP: January 22, 1987
- Boundary increase: May 17, 2021

Pillsbury Baptist Bible College was an independent Baptist college in Owatonna, Minnesota, United States that operated from 1957 to 2008. Pillsbury described itself as a "biblical arts college." It offered a four-year program leading to the degrees of Bachelor of Arts in Bible and Bachelor of Science in Bible, as well as several associate degrees and a Bible certificate program.

The campus was previously home to the Pillsbury Military Academy, Pillsbury Academy, and Minnesota Academy. In 1987 a historic district of five campus buildings was listed on the National Register of Historic Places as the Pillsbury Academy Campus Historic District. It was nominated because of its local significance in architecture, education, and religion, because it was the only 19th-century Baptist institution of higher learning in Minnesota, and because of its association with benefactors Mark H. Dunnell and George A. Pillsbury.

== History ==
The Minnesota Baptist State Convention opened the school as Minnesota Academy on September 10, 1877, as a college-preparatory school. The name was changed to Pillsbury Academy in 1886 in honor of one of its major donors, George A. Pillsbury, former mayor of Minneapolis and a member of the First Baptist Church of Minneapolis. In 1920 it was renamed the Pillsbury Military Academy. In 1957, after a dispute resulted in a change in Baptist Convention control from American Baptist to fundamentalist Minnesota Baptist, the Academy was abruptly closed and reconstituted as a 4-year biblical arts college, Pillsbury Baptist Bible College.

The older structures on campus were placed on the National Register of Historic Places on January 22, 1987, as the Pillsbury Academy Campus Historic District. The five contributing properties are Old Main (built 1889), Music Hall (1892), Jefts Hall (1910–11), Lindsay Hall (1913–14), and a heating plant (1893).

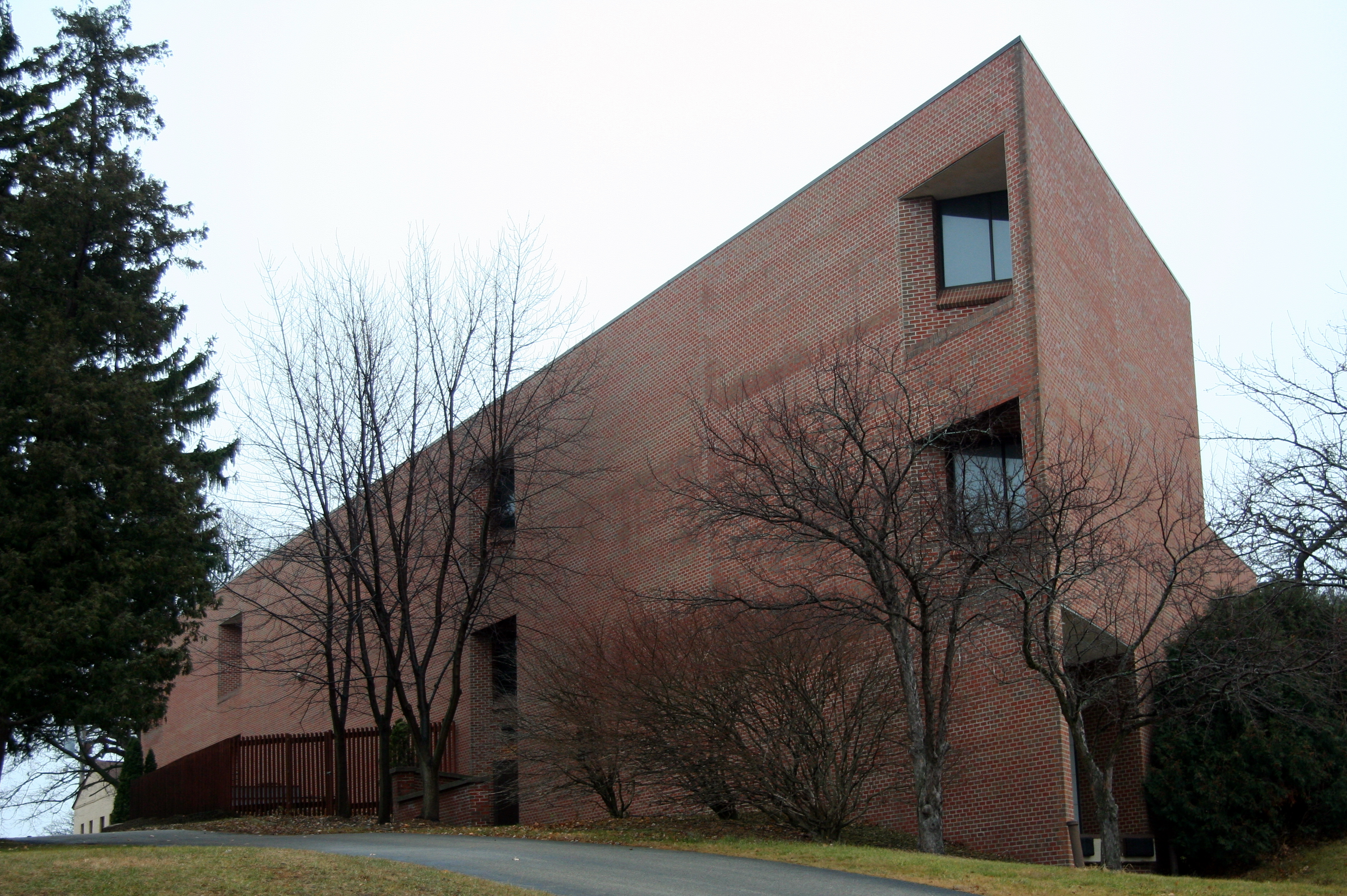
Pillsbury Hall, built in 1978

In February 2005, Pillsbury received accreditation by the Association for Biblical Higher Education (ABHE). Pillsbury also had membership in the American Association of Christian Colleges and Seminaries.

Enrollment at the school had dropped from a high of about 800 in the years 1967-68 to 142 in its final semester.

Pillsbury announced in October 2008 that it would permanently close at the end of the year and that its campus would be sold. The college closed on December 31, 2008. Pillsbury's transcripts are now held by Maranatha Baptist University in perpetuity.

In April 2014, the campus was purchased and revamped as a summer camp called Camp Pillsbury, which opened in June 2014. In addition to the camp programs that will be offered, a technical charter school operated by the Technical Academies of Minnesota will be housed on campus.

== Athletics ==
Athletic teams were called the Comets. The school had football, baseball, wrestling, cross country, soccer, and basketball for men and volleyball, cross country, softball, cheerleading, and basketball for women. Pillsbury Baptist Bible college was an NCAA division III institution. It was a member of the Upper Midwest Athletic Conference until 1988. They were the men's golf champions of their conference in 1995.

== Alumni ==
- Nathan Sproul (1994), Republican strategist and political consultant
- Mark Telloyan, St. Joseph County, Indiana Superior Court Judge

== See also ==
- National Register of Historic Places listings in Steele County, Minnesota
