= Nathan Sproul =

American politician

Nathan Sproul is a Republican strategist and political consultant for numerous election campaigns. Sproul is the managing director of Lincoln Strategy Group, an international political consulting firm based in Arizona. He is a former executive director of the Arizona Republican Party and the Arizona Christian Coalition.

== Education ==
He is a 1994 magna Cum Laude graduate of Pillsbury Baptist Bible College and has a Pastoral degree.

Nathan and his wife Tiffani (née Smith) graduated from high school at Tri-City Christian Academy in Tempe, Arizona. They reside in Chandler, Arizona with their triplets.

== Career ==
Nathan started his career as an intern for the Republican National Committee. In 1997, Nathan went to work for the Arizona Christian Coalition.

He served as the executive director of the Arizona Republican Party from 1999 to 2002.

== Sproul & Associates ==
Nathan started his own firm, Sproul & Associates in 2004. Also in 2004, he worked with the effort of removing the Arizona Clean Elections law formed in the spring by Representative Jeff Flake, an Arizona Republican. The ballot initiative would have essentially repealed Arizona's Clean Elections campaign finance system. Sproul was hired by No Taxpayer Money for Politicians to conduct a signature drive to get the anti-Clean Elections bill on the ballot. It failed its single subject challenge, with Attorney Lisa Hauser representing the inititiative.

In 2004 Sproul & Associates was accused by several former employees and elections officials of cheating to boost GOP registration in key swing states. A former tryout of Sproul said, they as canvassers for example pretended to be nonpartisan political pollsters on their mission and selectively got Bush-supporters to register to vote. A few workers would try to register some Democrats anyway, but according to the claim that was against the will of the company. Another former employee also provided KLAS-TV with shredded registration forms of Democrats. Also during the 2004 election, it was alleged that Sproul's company had set up voter registration drives on their premises under the name "America Votes", a name already claimed by a large, progressive organization.

According to a 2005 Baltimore Chronicle article, the Republican Party had paid Nathan Sproul $8,359,161, and alleged this is far more than what had been reported to the FEC.

== Strategic Allied Consulting ==
In 2012 Sproul headed up a company called Strategic Allied Consulting which was hired by the Republican National Committee to conduct voter registration drives in preparation for the 2012 election. On September 27 the RNC announced it was cutting all ties with the company when over 100 suspicious Republican voter registrations from the company were submitted by the firm to Palm Beach County, Florida. The RNC had also hired the company for similar work in Nevada, North Carolina, Colorado and Virginia. Authorities in six Florida counties were investigating suspected registration fraud involving the firm.

The Nation magazine, on September 26, 2012, described Sproul as "infamous for accusations that his firms have committed fraud by tampering with Democratic voter registration forms and suppressing votes." It noted that the Romney campaign, from November 2011 and ending in March 2012, had hired Sproul. It reported that following this, "there’s evidence that the payments continued, only to a different name," as only months thereafter, and months before the election, Strategic Allied Consulting was registered online and created as a business entity by Sproul. The Nation also reported that Sproul used a proxy that prevented others from seeing that his name as the registrant of the site, but that Greg Flynn of BlueNC had taken a screenshot of the Sproul registration of the site for Strategic Allied Consulting before his name was hidden from view.

Furthermore, The Nation reported that Flynn had found that GOP committees in North Carolina, Florida and Colorado had given Sproul large payments, and that "the firm has been aggressively hiring in Nevada, North Carolina, Virginia and Florida." The Nation also found that the California Republican Party had given $430,840 in payments to "Grassroots Outreach, LLC" an organization which, based on the disclosure reported by The Nation, "shares the same address as Sproul's office in Tempe, Arizona." The Nation also found that "Craigslist job postings in California and Colorado use identical language as Strategic Allied Consulting's listings in North Carolina."

After Florida prosecutors began investigating charges of voter fraud related to the company, the RNC said it was severing all ties to it. The RNC had spent $3.1 million with the company through the state committees in 2012.

== See also ==
- Voters Outreach of America
- America Votes
