= National Register of Historic Places listings in Steele County, Minnesota =

Location of Steele County in Minnesota

This is a list of the National Register of Historic Places listings in Steele County, Minnesota. It is intended to be a complete list of the properties and districts on the National Register of Historic Places in Steele County, Minnesota, United States. The locations of National Register properties and districts for which the latitude and longitude coordinates are included below, may be seen in an online map.

There are 12 properties and districts listed on the National Register in the county, including one National Historic Landmark. A supplementary list includes six additional sites that were formerly on the National Register.

This National Park Service list is complete through NPS recent listings posted April 10, 2026.

== Current listings ==
	Name on the Register	Image	Date listed	Location	City or town	Description
1	Ezra Abbott House	Ezra Abbott House	June 10, 1975 (#75001029)	345 E. Broadway St. 44°05′04″N 93°13′08″W	Owatonna	Circa-1860 house of an influential early settler of Owatonna.
2	Dr. John H. Adair House	Dr. John H. Adair House	July 3, 1986 (#86001406)	322 E. Vine St. 44°05′10″N 93°13′12″W	Owatonna	1913 Prairie School house, called southeast Minnesota's finest residential design by Purcell, Feick & Elmslie in its NRHP nomination.
3	Administration Building-Minnesota State Public School for Dependent and Neglected Children	Administration Building-Minnesota State Public School for Dependent and Neglected Children	May 12, 1975 (#75001030)	540 West Hills Circle; 44°05′22″N 93°14′17″W	Owatonna	1887 Romanesque Revival main building of a state school complex active 1886–1970. Also a contributing property to the Minnesota State Public School for Dependent and Neglected Children historic district. Now contains the Minnesota State Public School Orphanage Museum and city offices.
4	Blooming Prairie Commercial Historic District	Blooming Prairie Commercial Historic District	August 5, 1994 (#94000832)	Main St. E. between Highway Ave. and 2nd Ave. NE; 43°52′00″N 93°03′05″W	Blooming Prairie	Unusually intact business district of an agricultural trade center on the Chicago, Milwaukee, and St. Paul Railroad, with 20 contributing properties built 1893–1932.
5	Bridge No. L-5573	Bridge No. L-5573	January 25, 1997 (#96001613)	Township Road 95 over the Straight River, east of U.S. Route 65; 44°08′34″N 93°14′39″W	Clinton Falls Township	Also known as the Clinton Falls Bridge; an early use of steel for a truss bridge in Minnesota, constructed in 1894.
6	Minnesota State Public School for Dependent and Neglected Children	Minnesota State Public School for Dependent and Neglected Children	December 28, 2010 (#10001089)	Roughly bounded by West Hills Dr., State Ave., and Florence Ave. 44°05′25″N 93°14′15″W	Owatonna	Campus of a pioneering public institution for juvenile wards of the state, active 1886–1947, with 19 contributing properties. Also associated with nationally significant child welfare advocate Galen A. Merrill. Now the West Hills Complex.
7	National Farmers' Bank	National Farmers' Bank	August 26, 1971 (#71000441)	101 N. Cedar St. 44°05′06″N 93°13′33″W	Owatonna	Architecturally significant bank building designed by Louis Sullivan and George Grant Elmslie, the first of Sullivan's late-career "jewel box" banks. Also a contributing property to the Owatonna Commercial Historic District.
8	Owatonna City and Firemen's Hall	Owatonna City and Firemen's Hall	January 31, 1997 (#97000019)	107 W. Main St. 44°05′01″N 93°13′35″W	Owatonna	Multipurpose municipal hall built 1906–7, significant as Owatonna's government center and as an example of Minnesota's common late-19th/early-20th-century municipal buildings. Also a contributing property to the Owatonna Commercial Historic District.
9	Owatonna Commercial Historic District	Owatonna Commercial Historic District	February 2, 2015 (#14001237)	Roughly bounded by N. Cedar Ave., Broadway St., W. Bridge & W. Main Sts. 44°05′04″N 93°13′39″W	Owatonna	12-block downtown district with 75 contributing properties built 1871 to the late 1950s, associated with the growth and prosperity of an agricultural/industrial community and county seat.
10	Owatonna Free Public Library	Owatonna Free Public Library	June 7, 1976 (#76001075)	105 N. Elm St. 44°05′06″N 93°13′23″W	Owatonna	1899 public library noted for its Neoclassical architecture and contribution to Owatonna's intellectual and cultural development.
11	Pillsbury Academy Campus Historic District	Pillsbury Academy Campus Historic District	January 22, 1987 (#100006560)	315 S. Grove Ave. 44°04′56″N 93°13′10″W	Owatonna	Well-preserved campus of a small religious academy, Minnesota's first Baptist school. Boundary expanded in 2021 to include 11 contributing properties built 1889–1929 while it was a preparatory school and 1956–1967 once it became Pillsbury Baptist Bible College.
12	Steele County Courthouse	Steele County Courthouse	June 3, 1976 (#76001076)	111 E. Main St. 44°05′00″N 93°13′32″W	Owatonna	1891 courthouse, noted for its Romanesque Revival architecture and long service as Steele County's government seat. Also a contributing property to the Owatonna Commercial Historic District.

== Former listings ==
	Name on the Register	Image	Date listed	Date removed	Location	City or town	Description
1	Clinton Falls Mills and Dam		July 3, 1986 (#86001462)	December 8, 2004	off Co. Hwy. 9	Clinton Falls Township	Dam and water-powered grist mill built 1856–59. Demolished in 2003.
2	Kaplan Apartments		July 3, 1986 (#86001464)	September 20, 2007	115 W. Rose St.	Owatonna	1912 apartment house of Owatonna Tool Company founder Godfrey J. Kaplan. Demolished in 2005.
3	Owatonna High School	Owatonna High School	July 31, 1986 (#86002124)	August 2, 2000	333 E. School St. 44°04′46″N 93°13′12″W	Owatonna	1920 Classical Revival school. Delisted after being altered in 1998.
4	Owatonna Water Works Power Station		August 13, 1986 (#86001483)	June 7, 1993	W. School St. and Mosher Ave.	Owatonna	1890 water supply facility. Demolished in 1992.
5	Daniel S. Piper House	Daniel S. Piper House	February 24, 1975 (#75001028)	April 13, 2026	6523 County Highway 45; 44°10′01″N 93°14′47″W	Medford vicinity	Minnesota's only example of a New England-style interconnected farm complex, built in 1877, and a symbol of Yankee settler heritage in the state. The barn collapsed in 2024.
6	Steele County Courthouse		November 14, 1978 (#78001565)	November 30, 1987	139 E. Main St.	Owatonna	1874 Italianate courthouse. Demolished in 1987.

== See also ==
- List of National Historic Landmarks in Minnesota
- National Register of Historic Places listings in Minnesota
