= John George Lennon =

American politician (1858–1919)

John George Lennon (September 2, 1858 – September 7, 1919) was an American businessman and politician.

Lennon was born in Minneapolis, Minnesota and graduated from Owatonna Senior High School in Owatonna, Minnesota. He lived in Minneapolis with his wife and family and was a traveling salesman. Lennon served as the postmaster of Blooming Prairie, Minnesota and also served on the Blooming Prairie Village Council. Lennon served in the Minnesota House of Representatives from 1905 to 1914 and then in 1919 when he died from a long illness, while still in office. He was buried in Lakewood Cemetery.
