= Blooming Prairie Commercial Historic District =

Historic district in Minnesota, United States

- U.S. National Register of Historic Places
- U.S. Historic district
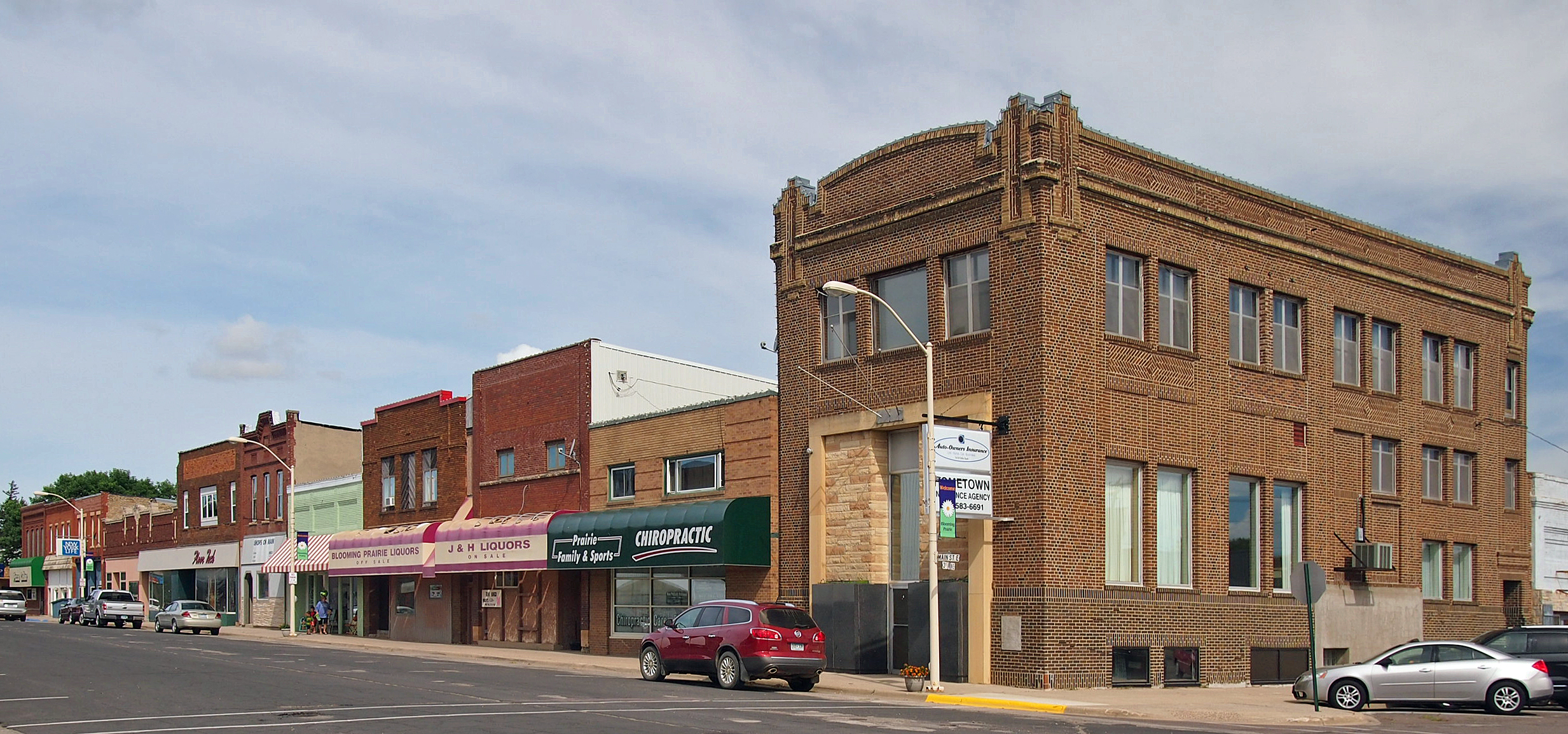
- Blooming Prairie's Main Street between 2nd and 3rd Avenues

- Location within Minnesota Location within the United States
- Location: Main Street E. between Highway Avenue and 2nd Avenue NE, Blooming Prairie, Minnesota
- Coordinates: 43°52′0″N 93°3′3″W
- Area: 5.2 acres (2.1 ha)
- Built: 1893–1932
- Architectural style: Late Victorian, Late-19th and 20th-Century Revivals
- NRHP reference No.: 94000832
- Added to NRHP: August 5, 1994

The Blooming Prairie Commercial Historic District is a designation applied to the historic downtown of Blooming Prairie, Minnesota, United States. It comprises 20 contributing properties built between 1893 and 1932. It was listed as a historic district on the National Register of Historic Places in 1994 for having local significance in the theme of commerce. It was nominated for being an unusually intact business district of an agricultural trade center on the Chicago, Milwaukee, and St. Paul Railroad.

The Blooming Prairie Commercial Historic District comprises both sides of Main Street East for a distance of two blocks.

== See also ==
- National Register of Historic Places listings in Steele County, Minnesota
