= Miriam Ibling =

American artist

- Born: Anne Miriam Christine Iblings; February 17, 1895; Parkersburg, Butler County, Iowa
- Died: November 9, 1985 (aged 90); Monterey, Monterey County, California
- Other names: Marian Ebling
- Occupations: artist, muralist
- Years active: 1935-1942
- Known for: murals

Miriam Ibling (February 17, 1895 – November 9, 1985) was an American muralist who worked on art projects for the New Deal's Section of Painting and Sculpture creating public art in Minnesota. Her lithograph Sheep Resting is in the collection of the National Gallery of Art in Washington, D.C.

== Early life ==
Anne Miriam Christine Iblings was born on February 17, 1895, in Parkersburg, Butler County, Iowa to Anna (née Paul) and Christopher Iblings. After graduating from Sioux Falls Baptist College, Ibling attended the Minneapolis School of Art, studying three years under Cameron Booth. She then studied for a year at the University of Minnesota before founding with other students, the Art League of Minneapolis.

== Career ==
From 1935, Ibling was painting murals in and around Minneapolis for the Works Progress Administration (WPA), in addition to working as an art teacher, graphic designer and painter. She created such works as a 1935 lithograph, Sheep Resting, which is currently in the collection of the National Gallery of Art in Washington, D.C.; an outdoor scene from 1936 which was featured on a wall in the basement of the Central High School; and a mural painted in fresco-secco, Youth and the Modern World in the Stillwater High School. The work, in the school's auditorium, symbolizes both community growth and the advances made in arts and sciences. In the Lymanhurst Hospital playroom she created a mural called Alice in Wonderland in 1937. (Note: Though the Federal Writer's Project and O'Sullivan call this painting Mother Goose, McCarney's project inventory calls it Alice in Wonderland, as does "American Paintings and Sculpture, which states "She also painted scenes from Alice in Wonderland for the Children's Hospital (later known as the Sister Kenney Memorial Hospital for Children)". The Minnesota Historical Society identifies the same painting with both names. Traditional characters in Mother Goose, "Baa Baa Black Sheep", "Jack and Jill", "Little Bo Peep", "Mary Had a Little Lamb", "The Old Woman and the Shoe", "Three Blind Mice" and others, are not in the painting. Traditional Alice characters, "Humpty Dumpty", the "Mad Hatter", the "March Hare", the "Red Knight and "White Knight", "Tweedle Dum and Tweedle Dee" point to the painting being Alice in Wonderland.)

In 1938, she painted two murals, named The Picnic and The Merry-Go-Round, in the library of the 1933 historic school building, now known as Merrill Hall at the Minnesota State Public School for Dependent and Neglected Children.

Ibling taught classes at the State Reformatory for Women in the 1940s, and an exhibition of their work was shown in March and April 1940. Her 1941 design, Orchestra, Attending the Opera, and Country Band Concert for Galtier Elementary School, in St. Paul, combined three studies illustrating American music. These were done as silk screens and applied to the wall after completion. The draft sketches for the stylized rhythmic figures for the three sections, "Orchestra", "Attending the Opera" and "Country Band Concert" are currently held in the collection of the Minnesota Historical Society. In 1943, Ibling created murals with Charles Morgan for the Minneapolis Service Men's Center, which was the year that the federal artist's program ended.

After her WPA period, Ibling taught until 1946 at Cherry Lawn School in Darien, Connecticut, before relocating to California in the early 1950s.

== Death and legacy ==
Ibling died on November 9, 1985, in Monterey, Monterey County, California.
