= Ezra Abbott House =

Historic house in Minnesota, United States

- U.S. National Register of Historic Places
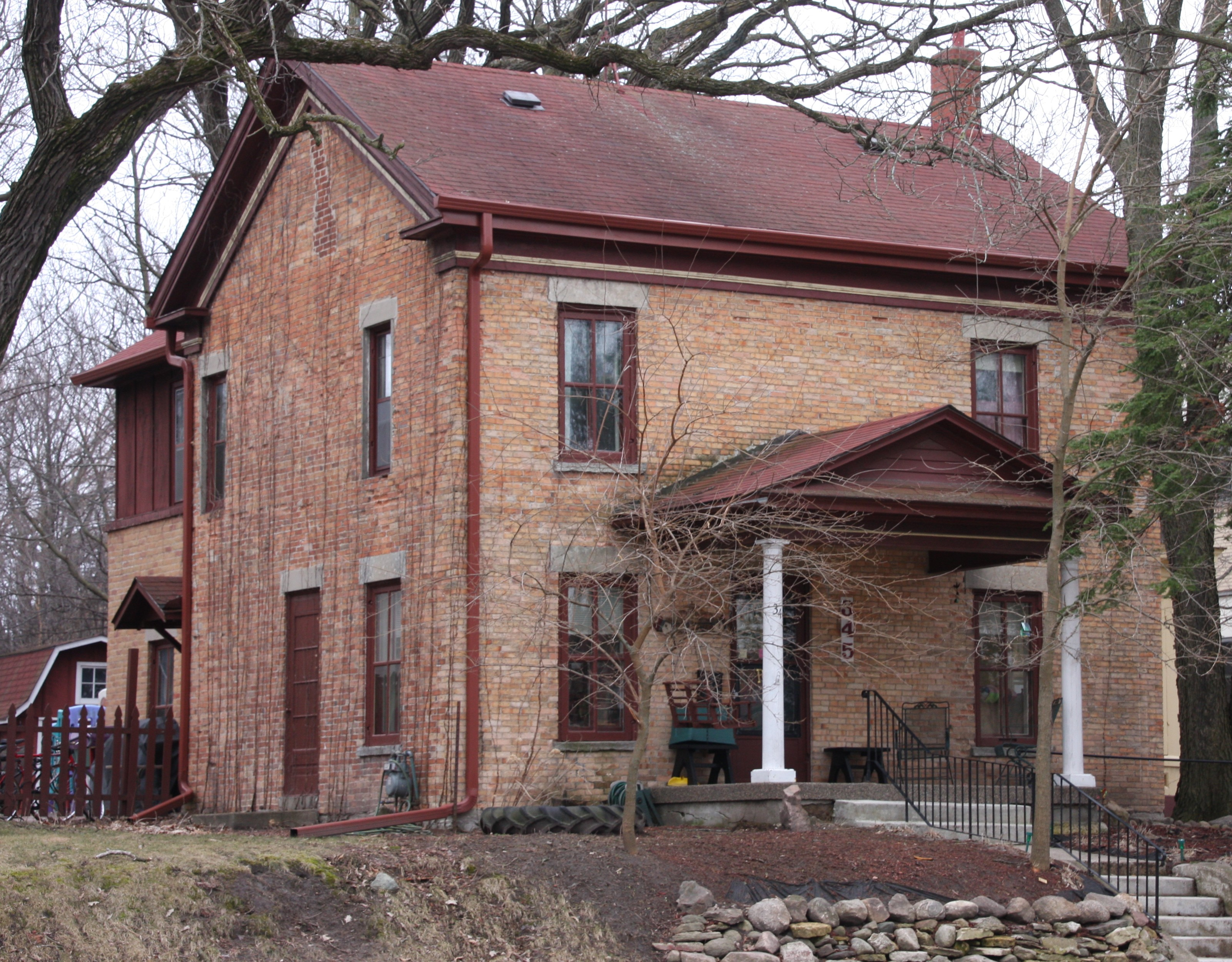
- The Ezra Abbott House viewed from the northeast

- Location within Minnesota Location within the United States
- Location: 345 Broadway Street East, Owatonna, Minnesota
- Coordinates: 44°5′4.5″N 93°13′8.3″W
- Area: Less than one acre
- Built: c. 1860
- Built by: Abijab Odell
- Architectural style: Greek Revival
- NRHP reference No.: 75001029
- Added to NRHP: June 10, 1975

The Ezra Abbott House is a historic house in Owatonna, Minnesota, United States. It was built around 1860 for Ezra Abbott (1805–1876), an influential early settler of Owatonna. The house was listed on the National Register of Historic Places in 1975 for having local significance in the theme of exploration/settlement. It was nominated for its associations with Abbott, who settled in Owatonna in 1855, helped survey the townsite, built the sawmill that produced much of the town's lumber, served as Steele County's first superintendent of schools, and helped advocate for the creation of the Minneapolis and Cedar Valley Railroad.

== See also ==
- National Register of Historic Places listings in Steele County, Minnesota
