= Warren Dunnell =

American architect

Warren Barnes Dunnell (1851–1931) was an American architect who primarily worked on buildings in Minnesota. Dunnell was born in 1851 in Norway, Maine. His parents moved to Minnesota in 1863 settling first in Winona and later moving to Owatonna. Dunnell attended the University of Minnesota in 1869 but later transferred to the Massachusetts Institute of Technology. He also studied at the École des Beaux-Arts in Paris.

Initially Dunnell worked for the federal government but he returned to Minnesota in the mid-1870s and found work with several other local architects including Samuel J. Brown and Abraham Radcliffe. In 1881 Dunnell established his own firm in Minneapolis focusing on churches, public buildings and institutional buildings such as schools and hospitals. Among the buildings he designed are the Fergus Falls State Hospital, the Minnesota Correctional Facility – Red Wing, the Minnesota State Public School for Dependent and Neglected Children and parts of the Minnesota Veterans Home complex. Dunnell's buildings included elements of various styles including Romanesque Revival, Beaux Arts and Châteauesque.

In the east, Dunnell was responsible for the Margaret Pillsbury General Hospital in Concord, New Hampshire (1890–91), a Châteauesque building built with a bequest from George A. Pillsbury.

Dunnell died in 1931.
