= Fergus Falls Regional Treatment Center =

Coordinates: 46°17′58″N 96°04′53″W

- Fergus Falls State Hospital Complex
- U.S. National Register of Historic Places
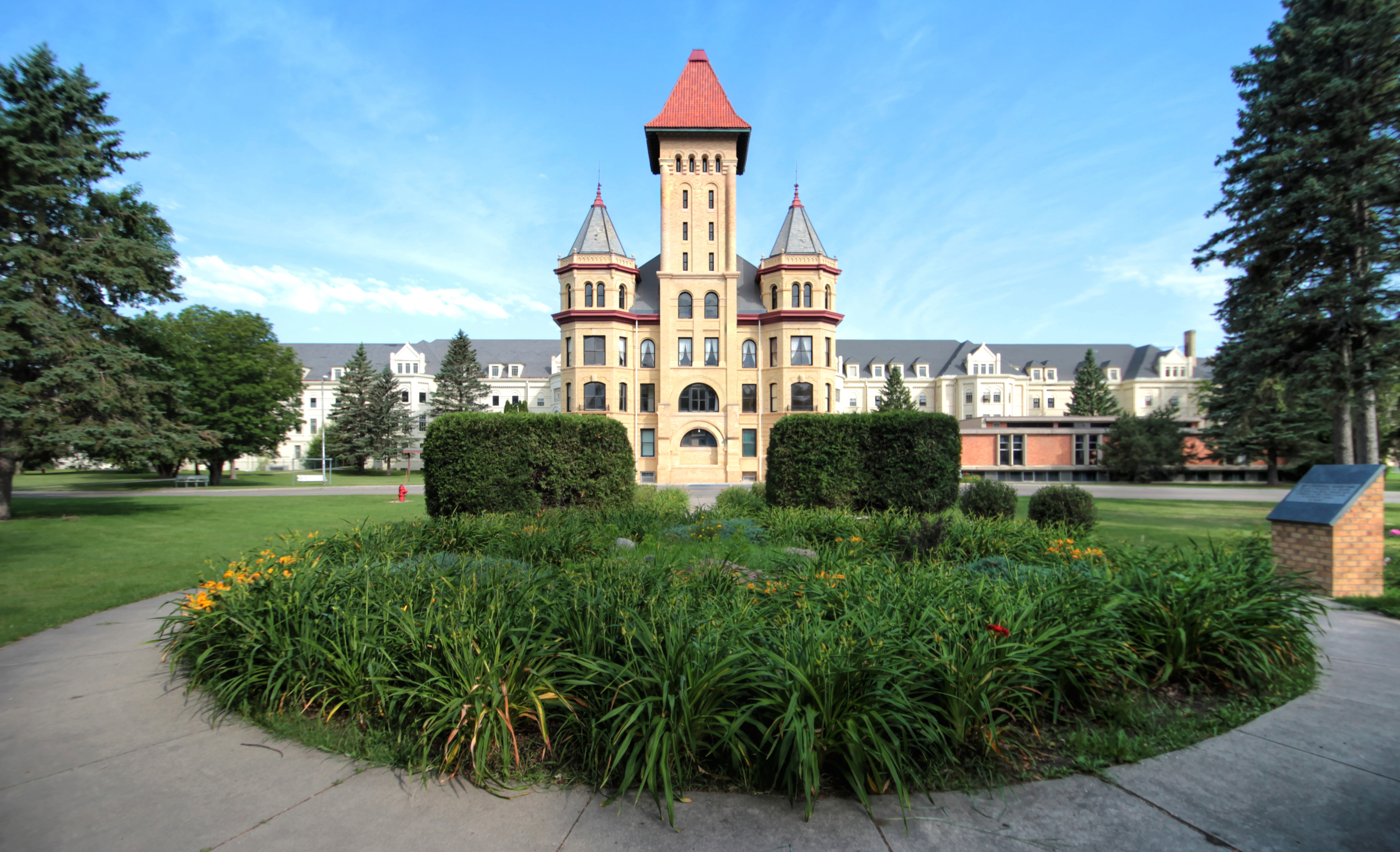
- Fergus Falls State Hospital in 2012

- Location within Minnesota Location within the United States
- Location: Minnesota State Highway 297, Fergus Falls, Minnesota
- Area: 11 acres (4.5 ha)
- Built: 1890
- Architect: Warren Dunnell
- Architectural style: Beaux Arts, Romanesque, Chateauesque
- NRHP reference No.: 86001386 (original); 16000746 (increase)

Significant dates
- Added to NRHP: June 26, 1986
- Boundary increase: November 3, 2016

The Fergus Falls Regional Treatment Center is a former hospital located in Fergus Falls, Minnesota. It was built in the Kirkbride Plan style and first opened to patients in 1890. Over the next century it operated as one of the state's main hospitals for the mentally ill and also worked with people with developmental disabilities and chemical dependency issues. It was added to the National Register of Historic Places in 1986.

The hospital closed in 2005. Various proposals have been made to repurpose the site and buildings since its closure.

== Background and design ==
By 1885, Minnesota's state institutions for people with mental illnesses were badly overcrowded. The State Board of Health declared in 1872 that the facilities at the St. Peter Hospital for the Insane were appalling and a disgrace to the state. Even after a second hospital was established in Rochester in 1877, conditions remained inadequate. In response, the state legislature commissioned the Third Minnesota State Hospital for the Insane in 1885. Since the existing hospitals were in southern Minnesota, the new hospital was to be north of the Twin Cities. Among the potential locations considered were Brainerd, Fergus Falls, Sauk Centre and Alexandria. On December 14, 1886, Fergus Falls was selected as the hospital site by a vote of 4-1. The name of the institution was changed accordingly to the Fergus Falls State Hospital.

The hospital was designed on a model established by physician Thomas Kirkbride. Kirkbride believed that building design was an important part of patient treatment programs. The typical Kirkbride structure consisted of a central administrative structure in the middle, with long, straight wings that radiated from it. Patients lived in the wings, which were uniform, precise, and austere. The bare façade was supposed to bring discipline into patients' lives. Kirkbride asylums were designed to provide "moral treatment." That included exercise, farming, entertainment, and classes like reading and sewing. Activities like farming and sewing provided occupational therapy and useful goods, but patients complained that they felt like chores.

== History ==
Designed by architect Warren B. Dunnell, the Fergus Falls State Hospital was one of the last Kirkbride structures built in the United States. The hospital had a sprawling campus and large stately buildings in accordance with the Kirkbride Plan. Only the West Detached Ward was finished in time for the hospital's opening in 1890. The other wings and the main building were finished by 1912.

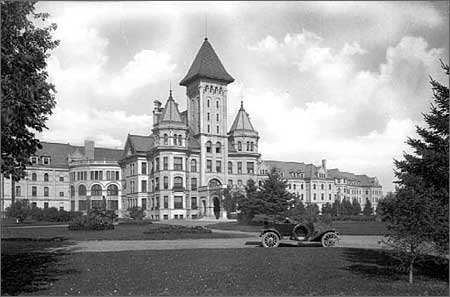
Fergus Falls State Hospital in 1912

When the hospital opened its doors on July 29, 1890 it received two men from an Otter Tail judge. The next day it received 80 patients transferred from the St. Peter hospital. The first patients were all men, and most of them were farmers or laborers. Women were not admitted to the institution until 1893, when 125 women were transferred from St. Peter. By the late 1920s the hospital's population was around 1,700 making it the largest mental health hospital in the state. As the institution grew, so did the town. The population in Fergus Falls more than doubled between 1890 and 1930.

The Fergus Falls State Hospital quickly became overcrowded, even though it had been intended to solve overcrowding problems. Patients could be admitted voluntarily but many were sent by court order. Most stayed for life. Over the course of the twentieth century, hospital leaders were on forefront of treatments like occupational therapy and shock treatment. Still, the court system treated the hospital as simply a convenient way to isolate social outcasts. Most patients were poor and had few resources in times of trouble.

After World War II, drug therapy led to better outpatient care, and the entire Minnesota hospital system was scaled back. In 1971, the hospital's mission changed. The Fergus Falls State Hospital became Minnesota's first multi-purpose regional center. That meant that it served patients based on where they lived, rather than what services they needed. Since its founding, the Fergus Falls institution had primarily served people with mental illnesses. After 1970, the institution began accepting patients with developmental disabilities and chemical dependencies as well because they lived in Northwestern or West Central Minnesota. In 1985, the hospital's name was changed to the Fergus Falls Regional Treatment Center to reflect its new mission.

== Closure and redevelopment ==
The Fergus Falls Regional Treatment Center closed in 2005 after gradually moving patients to smaller, community-based facilities for two decades. The state sold the land to the city of Fergus Falls in 2007. After its closure the building's future was uncertain. Preservationists have fought to save the main building. It was placed on the National Register of Historic Places in 1986, and it is one of the only remaining examples of the Kirkbride plan. Yet the city of Fergus Falls argued that the building was too large for a small town to redevelop or maintain and has considered demolishing it.

In October 2012, Colliers Real Estate listed the building for sale. In May 2013, the City Council considered plans to renovate the building for residential and commercial use by two different developers, including one with experience in preservation of historic properties. A plan was ultimately approved to develop the site and buildings into a hotel, a spa and restaurants.

This plan proceeded but later encountered roadblocks over financing. In October 2014 the developer asked for an investment of $700,000 from the city toward the project. In November 2014, after the city and the developer had appeared to reach an impasse, a citizens group launched a fundraising drive to raise the $700,000 needed to proceed with the development. The group had until December 31 to reach its goal. On January 18, 2018, however, city officials unanimously voted to seek state funding for demolition of the campus, citing doubt that sufficient funds could be secured for reuse of the facility. Fergus Falls officials requested $8.9 million of the state's bonding bill to preserve the vacant tower building, which would be the only structure of the site left standing. The state granted $3.5 million for the project in May 2018, and demolition began with the mid-century administration building, constructed in the 1950s. The removal of this building is outlined in the first phase of a two-step plan for demolition, and Mayor Ben Schierer has indicated that the city may still be open to practical suggestions for renovation of the original Kirkbride building.

== Current use as artist space ==
In 2014, Minnesota non-profit arts organization Springboard for the Arts received a $100,000 grant to establish a community development and artists residency program, Hinge Arts at the Kirkbride. Selected artists reside in apartments which were formerly a nurses' dormitory, creating a variety of art projects that often reflect on the history of the building and comment on the past and present of mental health treatment. Springboard hosted an annual Kirkbride Arts & History Weekend from 2013 to 2017, featuring tours, music, and speakers focusing on mental health and historic preservation.
