= Minnesota Veterans Home =

- Minnesota Soldiers' Home Historic District
- U.S. National Register of Historic Places
- U.S. Historic district
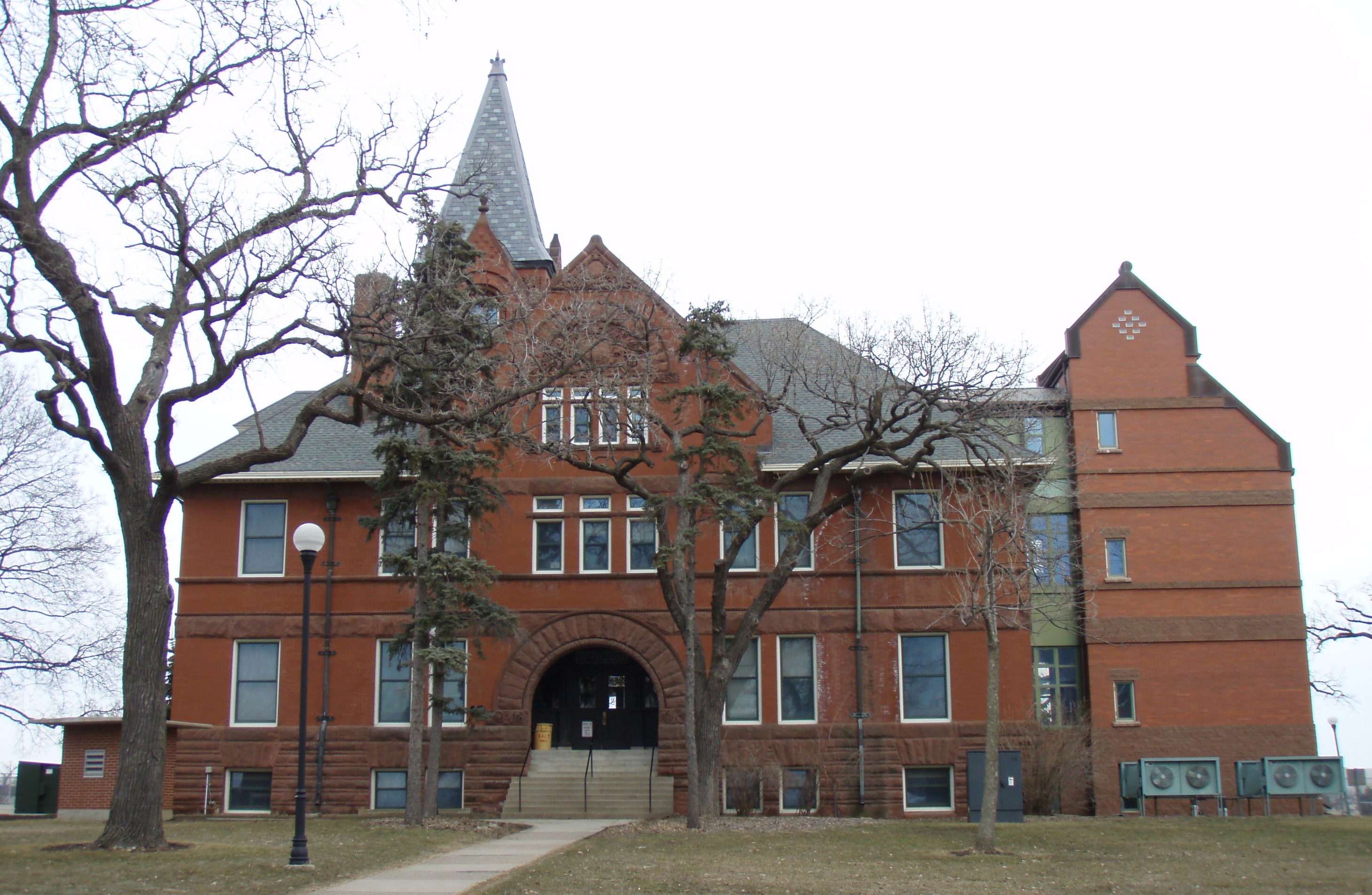

- Location within Minnesota Location within the United States
- Location: Roughly bounded by Minnehaha Ave., Mississippi River, and Godfrey Pkwy., Minneapolis, Minnesota
- Coordinates: 44°54′45″N 93°12′15″W
- Built: 1888
- Architect: Warren B. Dunnell; Horace W.S. Cleveland
- Architectural style: Classical Revival, Art Deco, Romanesque
- NRHP reference No.: 89000076
- Added to NRHP: March 2, 1989

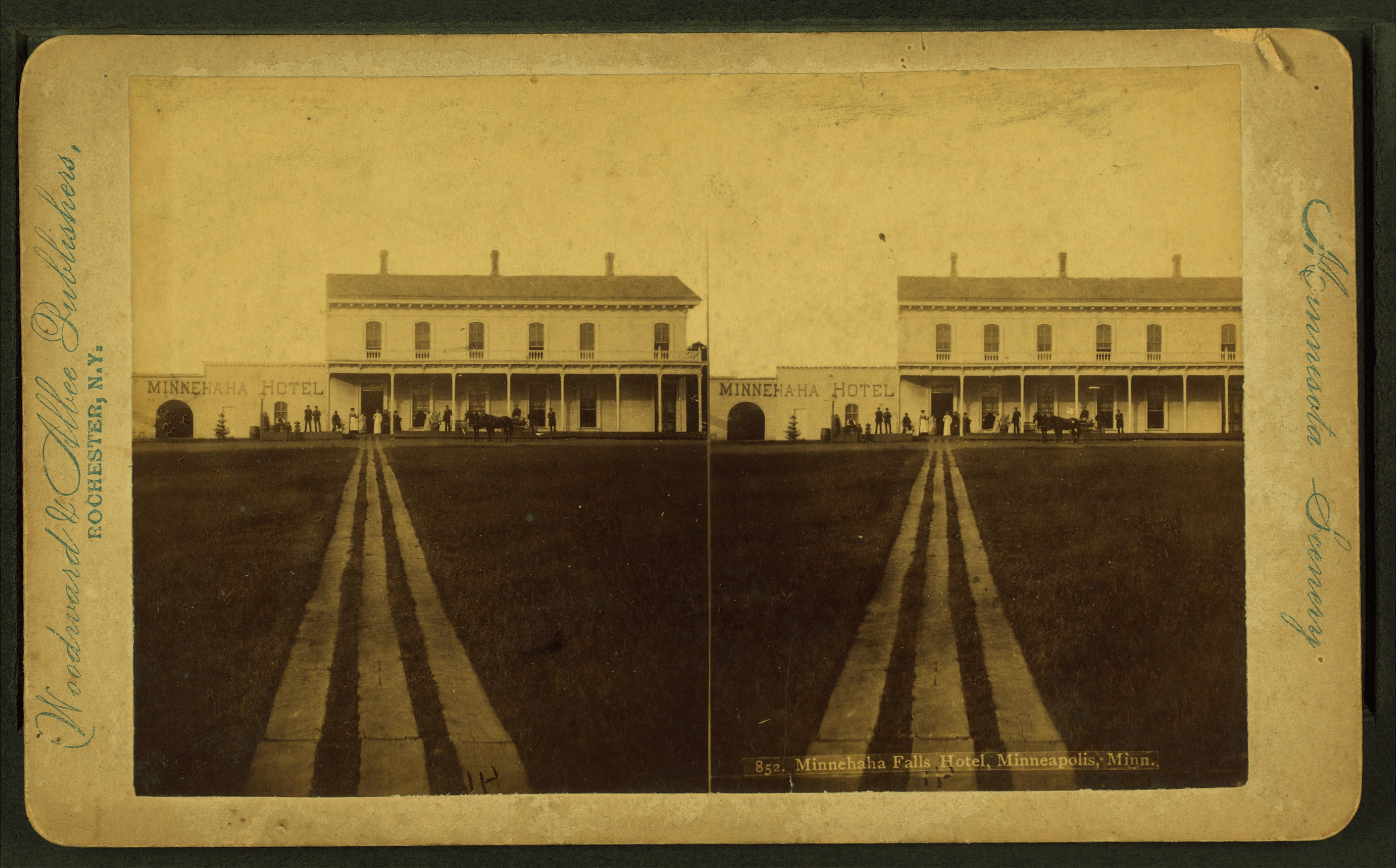
Minnehaha Falls hotel, Minneapolis (Later part of the Minnesota Soldiers Home) ~ Stereoscopic View, date unknown

The Minnesota Soldiers' Home, later known as the Minnesota Veterans Home in Minneapolis, is an old soldiers' home near Minnehaha Falls in Minneapolis, Minnesota.

== History ==
After the American Civil War and the devastation that it caused, there was sentiment that the United States should provide care for its veterans. The Minnesota Legislature authorized the establishment of the Soldiers' Home in 1887, as a "reward to the brave and deserving". Construction began the following year, in 1888. By 1911, the home had five men's cottages and one women's cottage, along with other buildings such as an infirmary, a dining hall, and so on. The home was originally envisioned as a place of rest and as a monument in appreciation of veterans' contributions. As such, it was beautifully landscaped, and medical care was not provided until after World War I. Even then, medical care was a secondary goal.

In the 1960s, the Soldiers' Home Board of Trustees recognized that the Home should provide health care as a primary goal. This shift was gradual. In 1968, the home was licensed for 56 nursing care beds and 375 boarding care beds, which were primarily non-medical care. The home was operated in a quasi-military fashion at the time. As priorities shifted, medical care became more of a focus. A new nursing care facility was built on the Minneapolis campus in 1972, with another following in 1980. In 1978, the old state hospital in Hastings was converted into a domiciliary residence for veterans. This resulted in a total of 250 nursing care beds in Minneapolis, 250 domiciliary beds in Minneapolis, and 200 domiciliary beds in Hastings.

In 1988, the Legislature reorganized the Veterans Homes, separating them from the Department of Veterans Affairs. The Veterans Homes Board of Directors was established to turn the homes into high quality health care facilities while also considering the special needs of the veteran population. The Board has memberships from both the health care field and veterans' organizations.

== Present Day ==
There are now five Veterans Homes in Minnesota. The Minneapolis campus has 300 skilled nursing care beds and 50 domiciliary beds, and the Hastings campus has 200 domiciliary care beds. A home in Silver Bay has 83 skilled nursing care beds, a home in Luverne has 85 skilled nursing care beds, and a home in Fergus Falls has 106 skilled nursing care beds.

The veterans' community, from the days of the Grand Army of the Republic and the United Spanish War Veterans to the present, has been active in supporting the Minnesota Veterans Homes. They promote the homes and provide awareness of the services provided by the Veterans Homes. They also play a role in advocacy by promoting the causes of veterans to make sure their needs are met. The community has also monitored the homes to ensure that residents are receiving quality care. Finally, the veterans' community has provided donations of money and equipment to the Homes. These donations have improved the quality of life for the residents.

== See also ==
- Minneapolis VA Health Care System
