= Minnesota State Public School for Dependent and Neglected Children =

- U.S. National Register of Historic Places
- U.S. Historic district
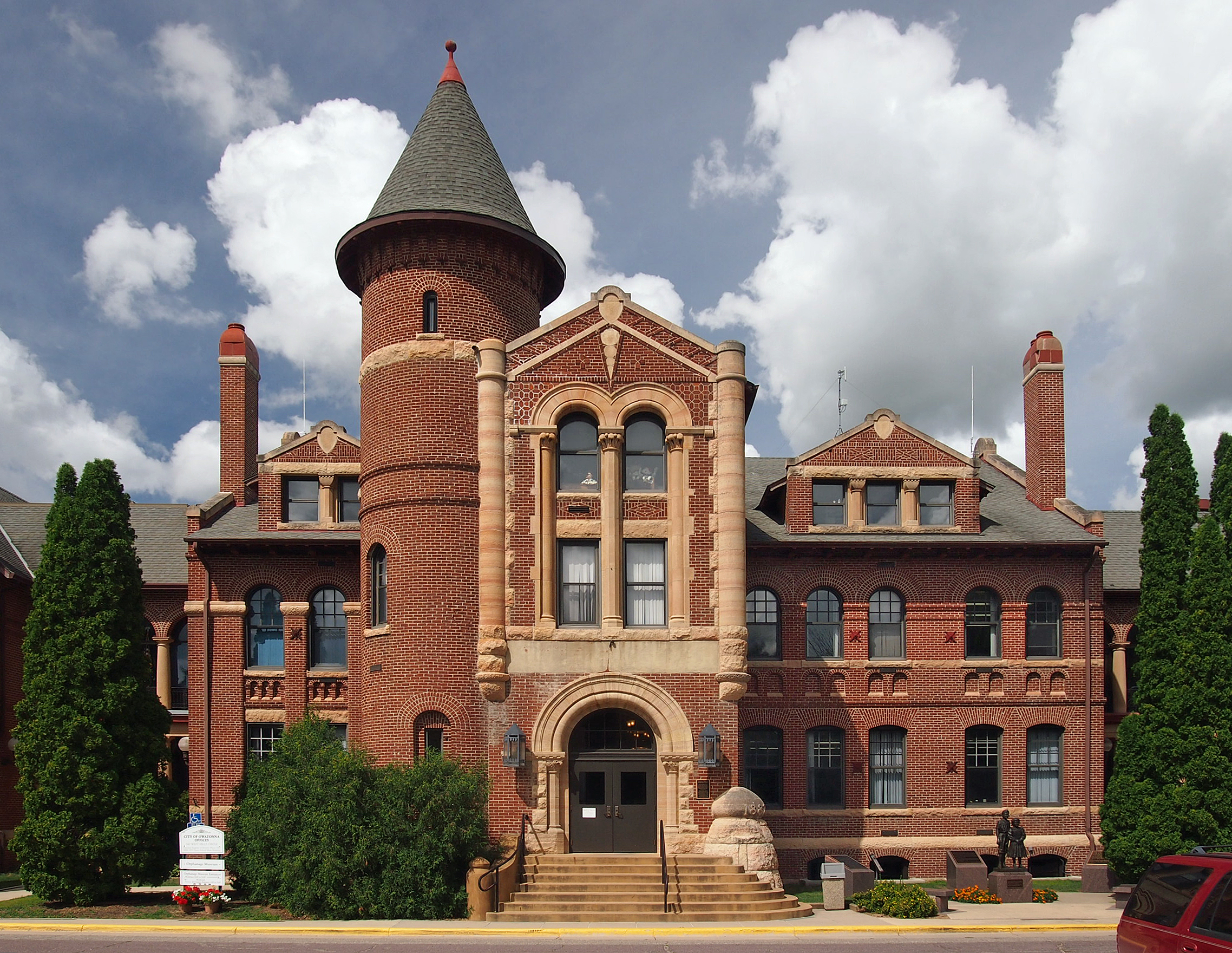
- The Administration Building of the Minnesota State Public School for Dependent and Neglected Children, viewed from the east

- Location within Minnesota Location within the United States
- Location: Roughly bounded by West Hills Drive, State Avenue, and Florence Avenue, Owatonna, Minnesota
- Coordinates: 44°5′22″N 93°14′18″W
- Area: 42 acres (17 ha)
- Built: 1886–1936
- Architect: Warren Dunnell, Clarence H. Johnston Sr., et al.
- Architectural style: Romanesque Revival
- NRHP reference No.: 10001089
- Added to NRHP: December 28, 2010

- Administration Building-Minnesota State Public School for Dependent and Neglected Children
- U.S. National Register of Historic Places
- U.S. Historic district – Contributing property
- Location: West Hills Circle
- Area: Less than 10 acres
- Built: 1887
- Architect: Warren Dunnell
- Architectural style: Romanesque Revival
- Part of: Minnesota State Public School for Dependent and Neglected Children (ID10001089)
- NRHP reference No.: 75001030

Significant dates
- Added to NRHP: May 12, 1975
- Designated CP: December 28, 2010

The Minnesota State Public School for Dependent and Neglected Children was a residential and educational facility for wards of the state from 1886 to 1945, located in Owatonna, Minnesota, United States. The State School was created by an act of the Minnesota legislature in 1885 as an effort to provide safe, transitional housing for the state's orphaned, abandoned, and abused children. The goal was to remove at-risk children from harmful situations and place them in the State School, where they would reside in a home-like setting, receive an education, and eventually be placed with suitable farm families. Over 60 years of operation, the State School was home to a total of 10,635 children.

The facility closed in 1945 as adoption and foster care came to be preferred over institutionalization. The State School complex became the Owatonna State School (OSS) for children with developmental disabilities. The OSS closed in 1970. After four years of vacancy, the campus was purchased by the city of Owatonna to serve as its new seat of government. The complex was renamed West Hills. The Minnesota State Public School Orphanage Museum on the grounds interprets the history of the site.

The main Administration Building of the State School was listed on the National Register of Historic Places in 1975. The larger complex of 19 surviving buildings, including the previously listed Administration Building, were added to the National Register as a historic district in 2010.

== History ==
The Minnesota State Public School for Dependent and Neglected Children was created by an act of the 1885 State Legislature, which was championed by Governor Lucius F. Hubbard and Reverend Hastings H. Hart, Secretary of the Minnesota Board of Corrections and Charities. Before this facility was created, orphaned, dependent, abused, and neglected children in Minnesota were placed in country poor farms with adult derelicts, petty criminals, alcoholics, and the mentally ill. This school was created to be a haven where these children could be saved from a life of poverty or crime, and transformed into productive members of society.

Minnesota chose to follow the cottage system developed by the Michigan State Public School in Coldwater, Michigan, which was created as an alternative to the linear orphanage system. The cottage plan was to offer the children a family-like group atmosphere with about 20-25 to a cottage. Each cottage was managed by a matron who lived in the cottage full-time. Eventually, there were 16 cottages on the grounds in Owatonna. By the 1930s, up to 500 children were housed at the State School at any time. Children were constantly being placed out, and new and unfamiliar children being placed in. These were orphaned, dependent, neglected and abused Minnesota children who had been made wards of the state by the probate courts. The State School was to be a temporary home, preparing the children for adoption or placement in new, "good" homes. While the intent was to keep the children only for a few months, some stayed on for years and suffered the effects of institutionalization.

=== Self-sufficient institution ===
The State School campus in 1910

The State School was often referred to as the "city on the hill" or as a "city within a city." At the height of its existence in the 1930s, the school housed 500 children in 16 cottages. Other buildings included a nursery, hospital, school, gymnasium, laundry, and residences for employees and the superintendent. The school had its own power plant, greenhouse, ice house, cemetery, and complete farm with cows, horses, swine, and chickens, making it close to being self-sufficient. The State School had electricity before the City of Owatonna did.

Many crafts were conducted right on campus. In a normal day a person could visit a functional bakery, cobbler shop, laundry, barber shop, sewing rooms, butcher shop, and carpenter shop. Originally housed on 160 acres, the grounds grew to 329 acres by 1937, with 42 acres for campus and 287 acres for cultivation to feed all the livestock, and fruit/vegetables for its inhabitants. In addition to grains, the State School farm produced potatoes, carrots, beans, squash, strawberries, raspberries, apples, etc. The wards were expected to act as the primary labor force, especially during harvest. Many foods were canned and stored for use in winter. A greenhouse was used to start the vegetables, fruits, and flowers each spring and two root cellars stored the harvested crops over the winter months.

The iconic Main Building served as the school nerve center. It was built in five phases, beginning in 1886 at a cost of $50,000 appropriated by the Minnesota legislature. Architect Warren Barnes Dunnell designed the first three sections. The Main Building was completed in 1887 and, when there was funding, the north and south wings were added in 1889. It came to house the library, chapel, offices, employee and children's dining rooms, industrial departments, and living quarters for small boys and employees.

=== Closing of the State School ===
By 1945, state public welfare officials came to believe that early foster care or adoption was preferable to institutionalization, so admissions ceased. In 1947, the Minnesota State Public School for Dependent and Neglected Children (SPS) was officially abolished and all its lands, buildings, property, and funds were transferred to the newly established Owatonna State School (OSS), which provided academic and vocational training for individuals with developmental disabilities. The OSS closed in 1970.

After standing empty for four years, the City of Owatonna purchased the campus area from the State of Minnesota in 1974 following a referendum. It houses administrative offices and related facilities.

== Minnesota State Public School Orphanage Museum ==
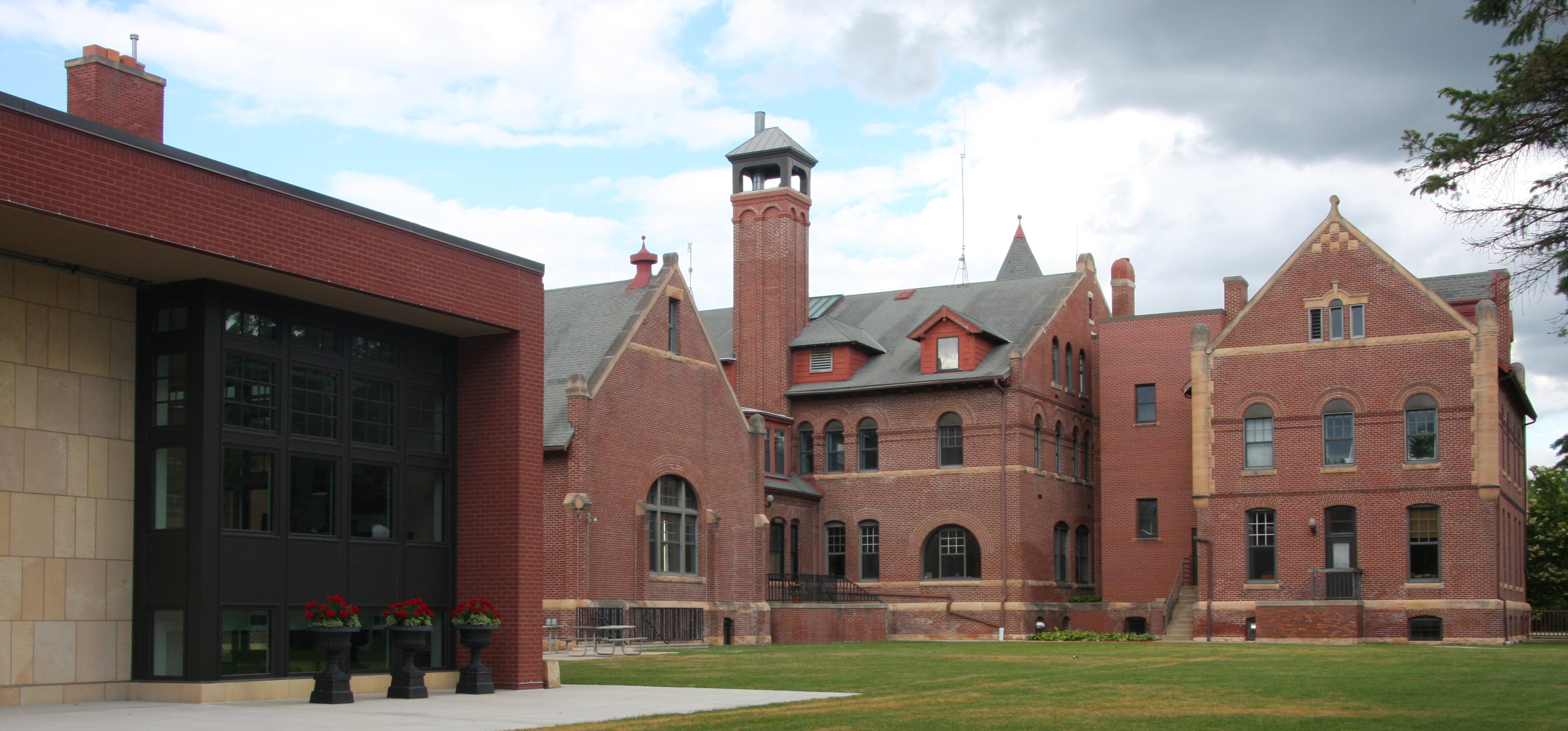
Minnesota State Public School Orphanage Museum, seen from the southwest in 2017

The Minnesota State Public School Orphanage Museum is located on the former State School grounds, which are now owned by the City of Owatonna. Visitors can learn about the history of the school and the children, watch a 1930s film taken of the children, walk through a restored boys' cottage, and stroll the grounds. The campus is one of the most intact examples of a state cottage school standing in the United States and is significant on a national level. The 1934 school building, now known as Merrill Hall, contains two murals, The Picnic and The Merry Go Round created by the WPA artist Miriam Ibling.

The museum exists in large part because a former State Schooler named Harvey Ronglien who believed that the memory of the children who lived at the State School and the way they were treated should not be forgotten. Harvey spent 11 years at the State School, arriving when he was just 5 years old in 1932. After retiring from a career as a lineman (technician) with Owatonna Public Utilities (OPU), Harvey and his wife Maxine began their effort to remember the children. In 1992, the first step was taken to get permission from the Owatonna City Council to have a statue representing the "State School Kids" erected in front of the former Main Building, which was used as the City Administration Building.

For more than twenty years, the Rongliens' work expanded to create the museum that exists today. In 2011, Maxine Ronglien was honored with an Advocacy Award by the Preservation Alliance of Minnesota. Over the years, the Rongliens also gave a presentation to hundreds of group tours and school groups about Harvey Ronglien's experiences at the State School, the effects of institutional living, and the importance of family.

The museum became a non-profit 501(c)(3) organization in 1999, and operated with a twelve-person board of directors. Following Harvey Ronglien's death in 2021, the museum announced a merger with the Steele County Historical Society.

=== Main Museum ===
The primary museum is located in the central hall of the Owatonna City Hall Building. This u-shaped hall hosts display cabinets with materials both sorted chronologically and by subject.

=== Cottage 11 ===
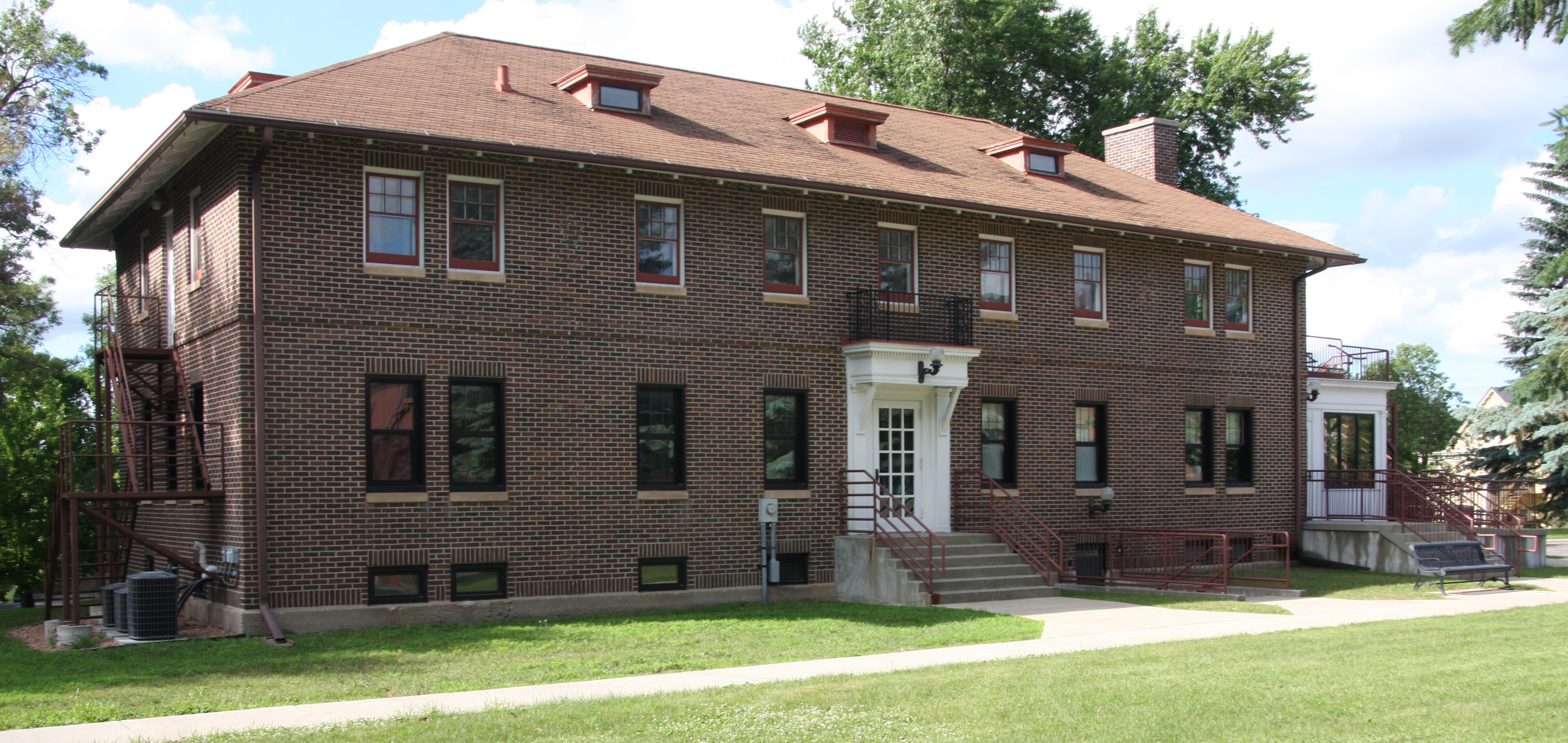
Cottage 11 in 2017

Constructed in 1923 by architect Clarence H. Johnston Sr., Cottage 11 was originally designed to house 25 boys, but eventually housed 30-35 boys from ages 6–13. In 2009, the restored cottage opened for tourists. Highlights include the original terrazzo flooring, bathroom fixtures and woodwork; a gift shop; and the opportunity to walk through an original cottage from the orphanage era and learn the story of the boys who lived there. The restoration process included removing walls, sanding floors, scraping paint, adding new furnaces and air-conditioning units, construction projects, painting, finishing floors, finding artifacts, and installing audio systems. Museum founder, Harvey Ronglien, lived in Cottage 11 for eight years and tells his story in the book A Boy from C-11, Case #9164.

=== Children's Cemetery ===
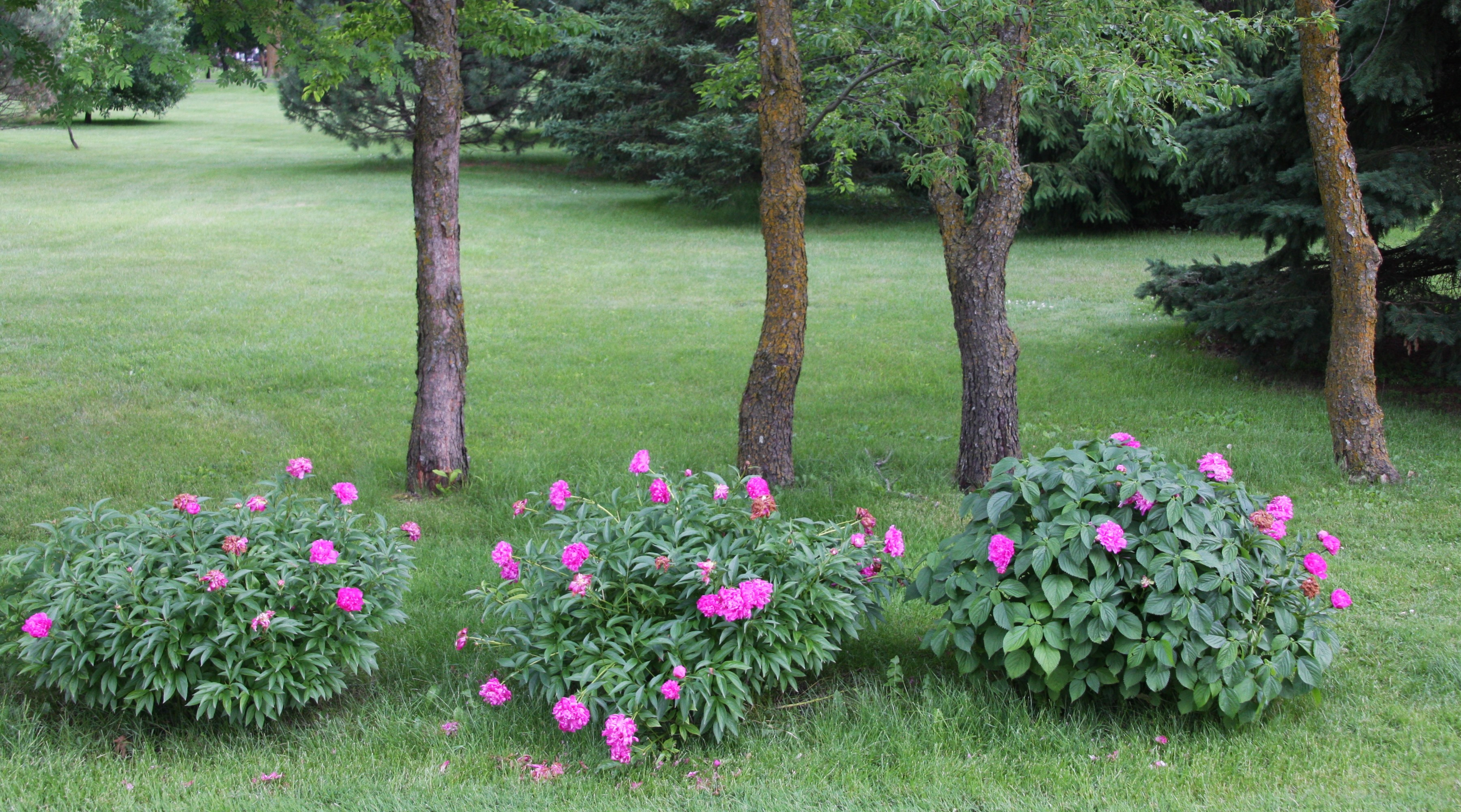
Children's Cemetery

In all, 198 State School children have been buried in the Children's Cemetery located in the southwest corner of the campus. The cemetery is open for public viewing, weather permitting. It has been restored by the Museum Board and local friends. The first 47 children were buried with a tombstone. However, the practice was then changed. The next 151 children who died were buried simply with their identification number etched on a slab of cement. Through a community effort, each grave now has a named marker. A memorial boardwalk also leads to the cemetery.

=== Outdoor Audio Stations ===
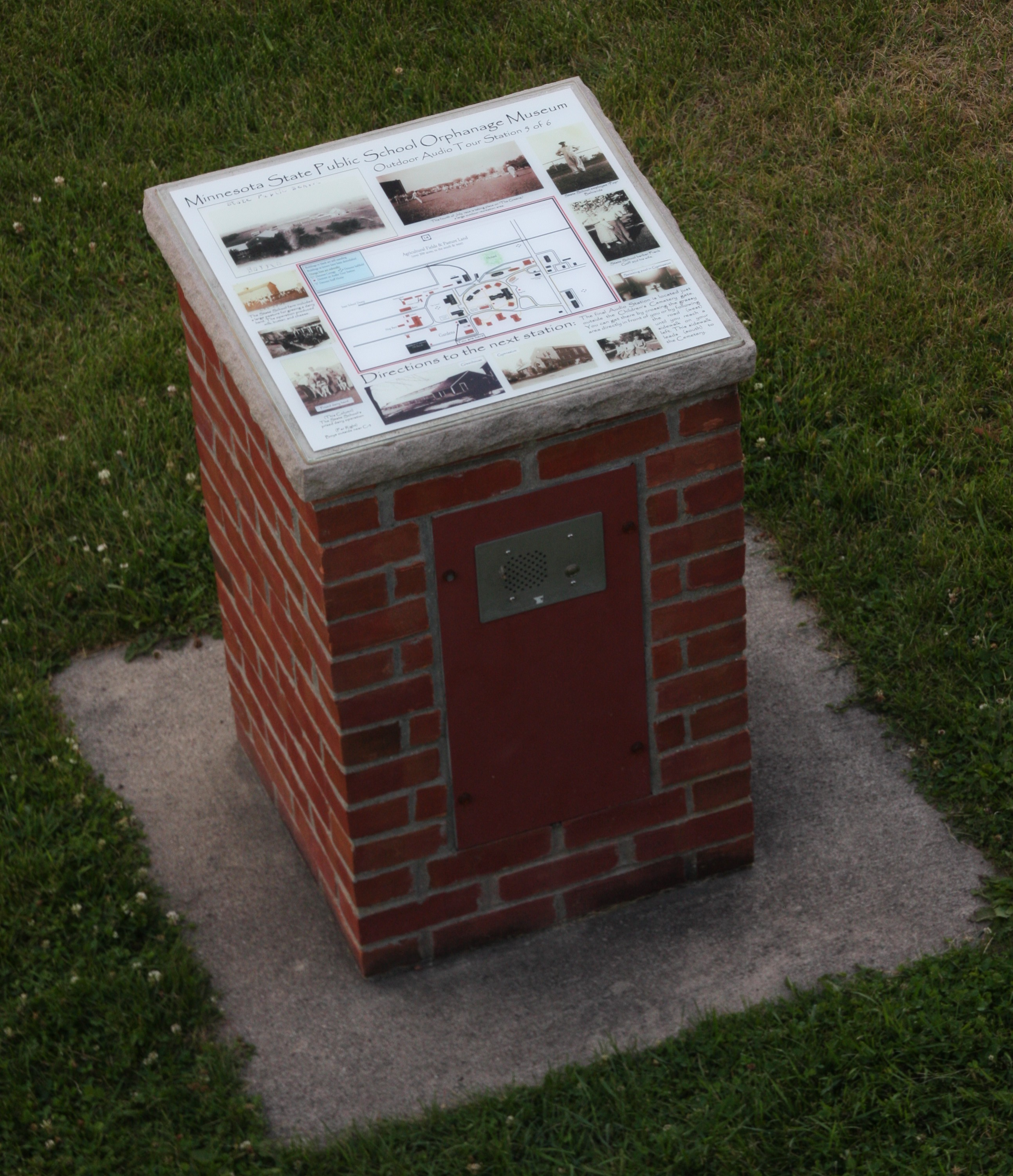
An outdoor audio station

Guests may explore the campus by following the six-station Outdoor Audio Tour. The tour stations lead to historic sites, such as the restored Boys' Cottage 11, the Children's Cemetery, Root Cellar, Flagpole Plaza, Rock Garden, and 1898 School Monument. The audio stations are activated with QR codes.

== The Children Remember documentary ==
The Children Remember is an 87-minute film that brings together a revealing and stirring collection of oral history spoken by thirteen candid survivors of life in the 1920s, 1930s, and 1940s at the Minnesota State School for Dependent and Neglected Children. It was completed in 2002, after a two-year production process. The film was the winner of the Bill Snyder Award for Best Documentary Feature at the 2003 Fargo Film Festival Fargo Film Festival and was selected as one of the Best of Fest at the 2003 Minneapolis-St. Paul International Film Festival.

Former State School residents in the film include: Oscar and Harvey Ronglien, Eva Carlson Jensen, Lester Felien, Eugene Bliss, Ruth Lowry Fizer, Richard Webber, Violet Grothe Conlin, Wilbur Hollister, Helen Hoover Bowers, Iris Avis Segelstrom Wright, Vivian Swan Manthe, Robert Charnell; State School family member: Arlene P. Nelson; State School staff: Grace Larson White, Luella Wardien Keller; community interviewees: Bernadine Haberman, daughter of "Joe the plumber" Pribyl; Jane Jacobson, Owatonna classmate and friend; Helen Patterson, Sunday School teacher, 1936-1941; R.W. "Buzz" Kaplan, high school classmate and friend.

Individuals involved in the production were: Kathleen Laughlin/producer, director, editor; Maxine Ronglien/executive producer; Michael Maas/project director; Harvey Ronglien/historian; Kevin Kling/narrator; Mike Hazard/writer; Ed Matney/camera; Ted Golbuff/sound; Robert Hughes/composer.

== Books by State Schoolers ==
Several former residents or their family members have written memoirs of their lives, including their time at the State School.

- God's Angry Man: The Incredible Journey of Private Joe Haan by B. Wayne Quist
- A Boy from C-11 Case #9164, A Memoir by Harvey Ronglien
- Iris Blossom and Boxing Gloves by Iris Segelstrom Wright
- Crackers and Milk by Arlene Nelson
- No Tears Allowed by Eva Carlson Jensen
- While the Locust Slept by Peter Razor
- My Light at the End of the Tunnel by Helen Hoover Bowers
- Patty's Journey: From Orphanage to Adoption and Reunion by Donna Scott Norling
- Barn Vet - The Story of a Minnesota Finn by Aaron P. Antroinen, DVM
- Minnesota Man by Jemkay Smith
- Pursuit of Perfection: From Orphanage to National Champion by Lynn Borland
- Little by Little: The Life Story of Tom Little by Mary Beth Frost

== See also ==
- National Register of Historic Places listings in Steele County, Minnesota
