= Dumfries, Minnesota =

Unincorporated community in Minnesota, United States

Dumfries
- Unincorporated community
- Location within Minnesota Location within the United States
- Coordinates: 44°20′42″N 92°07′13″W
- Country: United States
- State: Minnesota
- County: Wabasha County
- Township: Glasgow Township
- Elevation: 791 ft (241 m)
- Time zone: UTC-6 (Central (CST))
  - Summer (DST): UTC-5 (CDT)
- ZIP code: 55981
- Area codes: 651 and 507
- GNIS feature ID: 654682

Dumfries is an unincorporated community in Glasgow Township, Wabasha County, Minnesota, United States.

== Geography ==
The community is located between Wabasha and Zumbro Falls along State Highway 60 (MN 60). Wabasha County Roads 20, 30, and 86 are also in the immediate area. Trout Brook and the Zumbro River meet near Dumfries. Other nearby places include Wabasha, West Albany, Theilman, Kellogg, and Zumbro Falls.

== History ==
A post office called Dumfries was established in 1894, and remained in operation until 1912. The community was named after Dumfries in Scotland.
