= Bear Valley, Minnesota =

Unincorporated community in Minnesota, United States

Bear Valley
- Unincorporated community
- Location within Minnesota Location within the United States
- Coordinates: 44°18′12″N 92°28′39″W
- Country: United States
- State: Minnesota
- County: Wabasha County
- Township: Chester Township
- Elevation: 981 ft (299 m)
- Time zone: UTC-6 (Central (CST))
  - Summer (DST): UTC-5 (CDT)
- ZIP code: 55956 and 55041
- Area code: 507
- GNIS feature ID: 654590

Bear Valley is an unincorporated community in Chester Township, Wabasha County, Minnesota, United States.

== Geography ==
The community is located along Wabasha County Road 3 near Zumbro Falls. Cold Creek, a valley tributary of the nearby Zumbro River, flows through the community. 635th Street, 638th Street, and County Road 68 are also in the immediate area. Other nearby places include Zumbro Falls, Mazeppa, Oak Center, Lake City, and Bellechester.

== History ==
A post office called Bear Valley was established in 1857, and remained in operation until 1902. The community was so named on account of a bear sighting by early settlers in the valley.

The Grange association at Bear Valley was one of the earliest in Minnesota, established in 1870. The Bear Valley Grange Hall was built in 1874.
