= Chester Township, Minnesota =

Chester Township is the name of some places in the U.S. state of Minnesota:

- Chester Township, Polk County, Minnesota
- Chester Township, Wabasha County, Minnesota

== See also ==
- Chester Township (disambiguation)
