= Conception, Minnesota =

Unincorporated community in Minnesota, United States

Conception
- Unincorporated community
- Location within Minnesota Location within the United States
- Coordinates: 44°15′56″N 92°06′36″W
- Country: United States
- State: Minnesota
- County: Wabasha County
- Township: Highland Township
- Elevation: 1,168 ft (356 m)
- Time zone: UTC-6 (Central (CST))
  - Summer (DST): UTC-5 (CDT)
- ZIP code: 55945
- Area code: 507
- GNIS feature ID: 654652

Conception is an unincorporated community in Highland Township, Wabasha County, Minnesota, United States.

The community is located near the junction of Wabasha County Roads 14 and 18.

Nearby places include Wabasha, Kellogg, Theilman, and Plainview. The community is located within the Richard J. Dorer Memorial Hardwood State Forest.

The community was named for the Catholic church, the Church of the Immaculate Conception, which was built in 1866 in section 10 of Highland Township.
