= Lake Township, Indiana =

Lake Township is the name of three townships in the U.S. state of Indiana:

- Lake Township, Allen County, Indiana
- Lake Township, Kosciusko County, Indiana
- Lake Township, Newton County, Indiana

== See also ==
- Lake Township (disambiguation)
