= West Albany =

West Albany is the name of several communities in the United States. The name may refer to:

== Minnesota ==
- West Albany, Minnesota, an unincorporated community in southeast Minnesota
- West Albany Township, Wabasha County, Minnesota, a township in southeast Minnesota

== New York ==
- West Albany, New York, a hamlet of Colonie, in Albany County, New York
- West Albany Yard, a rail yard in the hamlet of West Albany, town of Colonie and the city of Albany, New York

== Oregon ==
- West Albany High School, one of two high schools in the Greater Albany Public School District of Albany, Oregon
