= Bear Valley Grange Hall =

- U.S. National Register of Historic Places
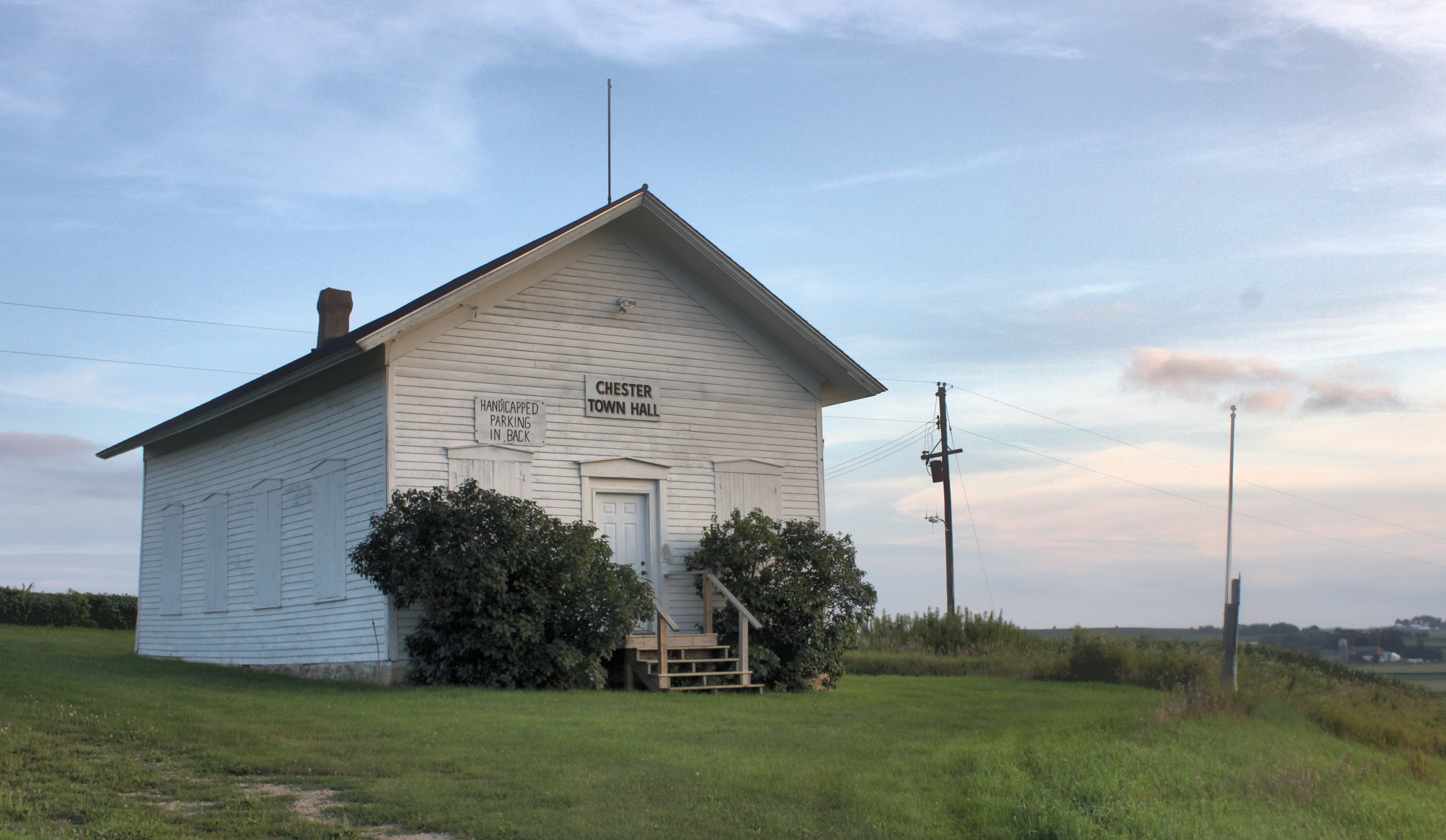
- The Bear Valley Grange Hall from the northeast

- Location within Minnesota Location within the United States
- Location: County Road 3, Chester Township, Minnesota
- Coordinates: 44°18′50.5″N 92°27′56.4″W
- Area: 1.5 acres (0.61 ha)
- Built: 1874
- Built by: Unknown
- Architectural style: Front-gabled vernacular
- NRHP reference No.: 88003089
- Designated: January 5, 1989

The Bear Valley Grange Hall is a historic meeting hall in Chester Township, Minnesota, United States. It was built in 1874 for the exclusive use of a local chapter of the National Grange of the Order of Patrons of Husbandry, an early farmers' advocacy group and fraternal organization. The chapter folded in the 1880s and the building has been used since as the Chester Town Hall. It was listed on the National Register of Historic Places in 1989 for having local significance in the theme of social history. It was nominated for being the only surviving Grange hall in Wabasha County—and one of only a few in Minnesota—and a rare example of a purpose-built Grange hall, as most chapters met in existing spaces like schools.

== Description ==
The Bear Valley Grange Hall is a one-story wood frame building on a limestone rubble foundation, measuring 40 by 22 feet (12.2 by 6.7 m). The narrow ends are gabled and contain the front and rear exits. This front-gabled form of vernacular architecture was used widely in the American Midwest for churches, commercial buildings, meeting halls, and schools. The front door, on the hall's north end, is centered and flanked by two windows with large wood shutters. There are four similar windows on both of the side walls. The windows and doors are topped by lightly peaked lintel trim with rain caps. There are no decorative elements otherwise. The building is sided with clapboard and consists of a single room.

The hall stands on a slight rise amid agricultural land. It is near the unincorporated community of Bear Valley along Wabasha County Road 3 in Section 24 of Chester Township. The nearest city is Zumbro Falls.

== History ==
The Order of Patrons of Husbandry was founded by Minnesotan Oliver Hudson Kelley in 1868 as the first national advocacy group for farmers. Envoys spread out across the United States helping local chapters, called "subordinate granges", to organize. Grange official T.A. Thompson of Plainview, Minnesota, arrived in Wabasha County in 1870 for this purpose. With his assistance Bear Valley was one of the first six subordinate granges in the county and the 50th statewide. The Bear Valley Grange built this hall for themselves in 1874. The selected site was on land owned by a farmer named C. M. Boutelle, adjacent to the principal local road, which ran from Lake City to Mazeppa. Of the 18 subordinate granges active in Wabasha County that year, only one other had its own meeting hall.

The rapid growth of the Grange, as it came to be known, was prompted by the massive changes in agricultural life after the American Civil War. Mechanized implements and more complex practises were being promoted, the rural population was booming, and railroad access linked farmers directly to eastern markets. Farmers previously engaged in subsistence agriculture were suddenly part of a vast, national economic network about which they had little knowledge or control. The Grange promised economic, educational, and social advancement for farmers, with opportunities to learn the latest scientific techniques, form agricultural cooperatives, and push for regulation of the railroads. The Grange also had a strong recreational component; rural communities had been lacking in social outlets aside from religious groups. Chapters hosted numerous lectures, potluck suppers, and other gatherings. Grange membership, open to any men and women involved in agriculture, numbered some 750,000 nationwide by 1876.

The initial heyday of the Grange was short-lived, however. Due to over-enthusiasm and poor judgment, several organizational efforts in Minnesota failed, and membership quickly declined. The Bear Valley Grange had been one of Wabasha County's largest, with over 100 members, but it dissolved in the 1880s. The hall was repurposed as a town hall for Chester Township, an ongoing use which led to the preservation of the building.

== See also ==
- National Register of Historic Places listings in Wabasha County, Minnesota
