= Lake Township, Minnesota =

Lake Township is the name of some places in the U.S. state of Minnesota:

- Lake Township, Roseau County, Minnesota
- Lake Township, Wabasha County, Minnesota

== See also ==
- Lake Township (disambiguation)
