= Francis W. Seeley =

United States Army officer

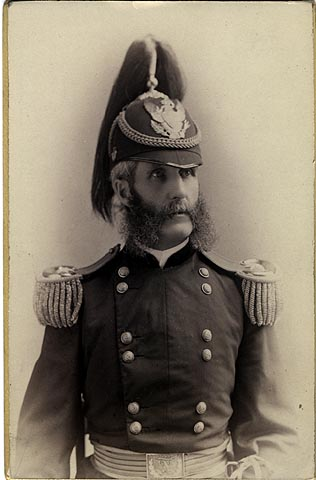
- Seeley c. 1887

15th Adjutant General of Minnesota
- In office January 8, 1887 – January 22, 1889
- Governor: Andrew Ryan McGill
- Preceded by: Charles M. McCarthy
- Succeeded by: John H. Mullen

Member of the Minnesota House of Representatives from the 10th district
- In office January 7, 1868 – January 4, 1869 Serving with George W. Bryant
- Governor: William Rainey Marshall

Personal details
- Born: Francis Webb Seeley; April 12, 1837 Ashtabula, Ohio, U.S.
- Died: December 29, 1910 (aged 73) Sawtelle, Los Angeles, California, U.S.
- Resting place: Los Angeles National Cemetery; Los Angeles, California, U.S.
- Other political affiliations: Republican

Military service
- Branch/service: United States Army; Minnesota National Guard
- Years of service: 1855–1864; 1887–1889
- Rank: Brigadier General; Brevet Captain
- Unit: 3rd Field Artillery Regiment; 4th Regiment of Artillery; 4th U.S. Artillery, Battery K
- Commands: 4th U.S. Artillery, Battery K
- Battles/wars: American Civil War

Francis Webb Seeley (April 12, 1837 – December 29, 1910) was a brigadier general in the United States Army who served as the Adjutant General of the Department of Florida and the Adjutant General of Minnesota. During the American Civil War Seeley commanded Battery K of the 4th Regiment of Artillery and served with distinction at the Battle of Chancellorsville and again at the Battle of Gettysburg where he was twice wounded. Seeley later served as a Republican state legislator in the Minnesota House of Representatives.

== Early life and family ==
Seeley was born on April 12, 1837, in Ashtabula, Ohio, to parents Ira O. Seeley and Sarah Seeley (née Loveland).^{:1275} Seeley's family moved to Wisconsin Territory in 1847, settling in Berlin, Wisconsin.^{:236} At age sixteen Seeley and his family moved to Wabasha County, Minnesota and settled in Mazeppa, Minnesota.^{:127}^{4-1275} Seeley's father, Ira, was a farmer and politician who served in the Minnesota House during the 1st Minnesota Legislature.^{:127}^{4-1275}

== Military career ==
Seeley began his military career on February 15, 1855, he enlisted in the United States Army at Fort Snelling. Seeley originally served as a non-commissioned officer in Thomas Sherman's Battery E of the 3rd Field Artillery Regiment.^{:1275} At the time Sherman's battery was garrisoned at Fort Snelling in Minnesota Territory.^{:6}

On September 19, 1860, Seeley was promoted to the rank of brevet Second Lieutenant in the 3rd Artillery Regiment. Seeley was breveted by President of the United States, James Buchanan.^{:1275} The following year on February 4, 1861, Seeley was promoted to the rank of full Second Lieutenant before being promoted to First Lieutenant on May 14, 1861.^{:1275} Seeley briefly worked in the Adjutant General's Office from February 21 to March, 1861, before transferring to Battery H of the 2nd Regiment of Artillery on April 1. Seeley was later assigned to Fort Pickens on April 15, 1861.^{:2}

From July, 1861, to January 18, 1862, Seeley served as the Adjutant General of the Department of Florida under Harvey Brown. Seeley was present at the Battle of Santa Rosa Island and the bombardments of Fort McRee and Fort Barrancas, which occurred during the Battle of Pensacola.^{:1275} Seeley eventually resigned from his position as Adjutant General in order to command the 4th U.S. Artillery, Battery K. Seeley and Battery K participated in the Siege of Yorktown, the Battle of Oak Grove, the Battle of Malvern Hill, and the Battle of Fredericksburg.

During the Battle of Chancellorsville Seeley is noted as being the last Union artillery battery to fire at Confederate forces.^{:127}^{6} During the battle, Seeley's battery covered the Union Army's retreat and suffered severe casualties including one officer and forty enlisted men killed and wounded, as well as the loss of nearly sixty horses.^{:127}^{6} For his role at Chancellorsville Seeley was promoted to the rank of brevet Captain on May 30, 1863.^{:1275} Seeley later fought at the Battle of Gettysburg where he was wounded in action twice while commanding Battery K.^{:127}^{6}

Seeley was forced to leave the field until August 15, 1863, in order to recover from his wounds before returning to his command on October 1, 1863. Seeley was later appointed as the Regimental Quartermaster at Fort Washington, Maryland until his resignation from the military. Seeley resigned his commission on August 31, 1864, due to his injuries.^{:127}^{6}

== Political career and death ==
Following his military service Seeley returned to Minnesota where he worked as a farmer, however, he was forced to give up farming due to his disability from wartime injuries.^{:127}^{6}

Seeley was elected to serve in the Minnesota House of Representatives on November 5, 1867, representing Minnesota's 10th House district. Seeley served during the 10th Minnesota Legislature, during his term he was the chairman of the military affairs committee and was a member of the elections and incorporations committees.

In March of 1873, President Ulysses S. Grant appointed Seeley as the postmaster of Clear Lake, Minnesota.^{:127}^{6} Seeley served as the postmaster of Clear Lake from March 12, 1873, to March 27, 1885.

Seeley was later appointed by Andrew Ryan McGill as the Adjutant General of Minnesota for a single term from January 8, 1887, to January 22, 1889. During his term Seeley held the rank of Brigadier General.

Seeley died on December 29, 1910, in Sawtelle, Los Angeles. Seeley is buried in Los Angeles National Cemetery.

== Personal life ==
Seeley was married to Emily C. Loveland on August 5, 1863, together they had one daughter.^{:127}^{6}
