= Ira O. Seeley =

American politician

- Ambrotype of Seeley c. 1858

Member of the Minnesota House of Representatives from the 12th district
- In office December 2, 1857 – December 6, 1859 Serving with Nathaniel Tefft and Thomas A. Thompson
- Governor: Samuel Medary; Henry Hastings Sibley

Personal details
- Born: 1815 Lake Luzerne, New York, U.S.
- Died: January 31, 1889 (aged 73–74) Louisburg, Minnesota, U.S.
- Other political affiliations: Democrat

Ira Orton Seeley (c. 1815 – January 31, 1889), also known as I.O. Seeley, was an American politician and farmer who founded the city of Mazeppa, Minnesota. Seeley served as single term in the Minnesota House of Representatives.

== Early life and education ==
Seeley was born around 1815 in Lake Luzerne, New York to parents Ajax T. Seeley and Delight Seeley (née Painter).^{:1274} At a young age, Seeley's family moved to Ashtabula County, Ohio where Seeley spent much of his childhood working on a farm.^{:1274} Seeley received limited education in a local schoolhouse before working as a carpenter.^{:1274} Seeley moved with his family to Wisconsin Territory and settled in Strong's Landing, now Berlin, Wisconsin, in 1847.^{:236} In the autumn of 1854, Seeley and three others explored Minnesota Territory near the Zumbro River before staking a land claim in modern-day Mazeppa, Minnesota.^{:727,1274} To signify his claim, Seeley constructed a log cabin and later a log house in Mazeppa.^{:1275} Seeley is recognized as the first permanent settler of Mazeppa.^{:1275}^{:104}

== Political career ==
While living in Berlin, Wisconsin Seeley was elected as the town's first justice of the peace.^{:227} Once settled in Minnesota, Seeley was elected to serve in the Minnesota House of Representatives on October 13, 1857, representing the 12th House district in the 1st Minnesota Legislature. During his term in the Minnesota Legislature Seeley was a member of the rules and joint rules committee. Seely identified as a Democrat up until the American Civil War, according to the book History of Wabasha County, Together with Biographical Matters, Seeley was "elected to the first state legislature by the Republicans".^{:1275}

== Later life and death ==
In 1881 Seeley moved to Appleton, Minnesota.^{:1275} Seeley died on January 31, 1889, in Louisburg, Minnesota.

== Personal life ==
Seeley was married to Sarah Loveland in 1836, together they had eight children.^{:1274} One of Seeley's sons, Francis W. Seeley, served in the American Civil War^{:1275} and was later the fifteenth Adjutant General of Minnesota.
