= Chester Township, Michigan =

Chester Township is the name of some places in the U.S. state of Michigan:

- Chester Township, Eaton County, Michigan
- Chester Township, Otsego County, Michigan
- Chester Township, Ottawa County, Michigan

== See also ==
- Chester Township (disambiguation)
