= Silver Lake Historic District =

Silver Lake Historic District may refer to:

- Silver Lake District, list on the National Register of Historic Places (NRHP) in Harrisville, New Hampshire
- Silver Lake Historic District (Silver Lake, Indiana), listed on the NRHP in Kosciusko County, Indiana
- Silver Lake Historic District (Harding, New Jersey), listed on the NRHP in Morris County, New Jersey
- Silver Lake Institute Historic District, listed on the NRHP in Wyoming County, New York
