= Lake Township =

Lake Township may refer to:

== Arkansas ==
- Lake Township, Greene County, Arkansas, in Greene County, Arkansas
- Lake Township, Perry County, Arkansas, in Perry County, Arkansas
- Lake Township, Phillips County, Arkansas, in Phillips County, Arkansas

== Illinois ==
- Lake Township, Clinton County, Illinois

== Indiana ==
- Lake Township, Allen County, Indiana
- Lake Township, Kosciusko County, Indiana
- Lake Township, Newton County, Indiana

== Iowa ==
- Lake Township, Cerro Gordo County, Iowa
- Lake Township, Clay County, Iowa
- Lake Township, Humboldt County, Iowa
- Lake Township, Monona County, Iowa
- Lake Township, Muscatine County, Iowa
- Lake Township, Pocahontas County, Iowa
- Lake Township, Pottawattamie County, Iowa, in Pottawattamie County, Iowa
- Lake Township, Wright County, Iowa

== Kansas ==
- Lake Township, Harvey County, Kansas
- Lake Township, Scott County, Kansas, in Scott County, Kansas

== Michigan ==
- Lake Charter Township, Michigan in Berrien County
- Lake Township, Benzie County, Michigan
- Lake Township, Huron County, Michigan
- Lake Township, Lake County, Michigan
- Lake Township, Macomb County, Michigan
- Lake Township, Menominee County, Michigan
- Lake Township, Missaukee County, Michigan
- Lake Township, Roscommon County, Michigan

== Minnesota ==
- Lake Township, Roseau County, Minnesota
- Lake Township, Wabasha County, Minnesota

== Missouri ==
- Lake Township, Buchanan County, Missouri
- Lake Township, Vernon County, Missouri

== Nebraska ==
- Lake Township, Hall County, Nebraska
- Lake Township, Holt County, Nebraska
- Lake Township, Phelps County, Nebraska

== North Dakota ==
- Lake Township, Cass County, North Dakota, in Cass County, North Dakota

== Ohio ==
- Lake Township, Ashland County, Ohio
- Lake Township, Logan County, Ohio
- Lake Township, Stark County, Ohio
- Lake Township, Wood County, Ohio

== Pennsylvania ==
- Lake Township, Luzerne County, Pennsylvania
- Lake Township, Mercer County, Pennsylvania
- Lake Township, Wayne County, Pennsylvania

== South Dakota ==
- Lake Township, Aurora County, South Dakota, in Aurora County, South Dakota
- Lake Township, Clark County, South Dakota, in Clark County, South Dakota
- Lake Township, Codington County, South Dakota, in Codington County, South Dakota
- Lake Township, Corson County, South Dakota, in Corson County, South Dakota
- Lake Township, Marshall County, South Dakota, in Marshall County, South Dakota
- Lake Township, Roberts County, South Dakota, in Roberts County, South Dakota
- Lake Township, Spink County, South Dakota, in Spink County, South Dakota
- Lake Township, Tripp County, South Dakota, in Tripp County, South Dakota
