= South Troy, Minnesota =

Unincorporated community in Minnesota, United States

South Troy
- Unincorporated community
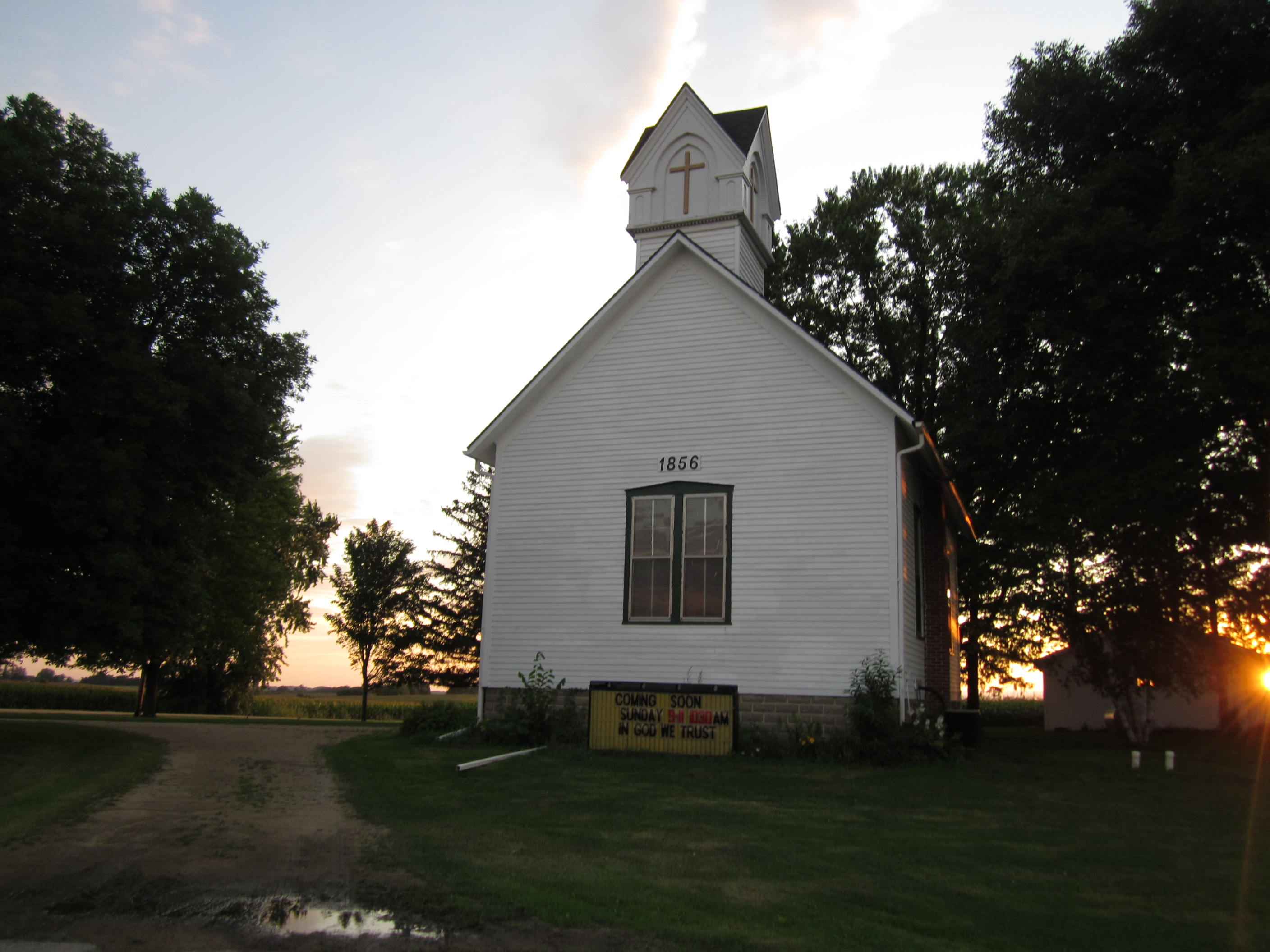
- South Troy Wesleyan Church

- Location within Minnesota Location within the United States
- Coordinates: 44°12′20″N 92°26′0″W
- Country: United States
- State: Minnesota
- County: Wabasha County
- Township: Zumbro Township
- Elevation: 1,161 ft (354 m)
- Time zone: UTC-6 (Central (CST))
  - Summer (DST): UTC-5 (CDT)
- ZIP code: 55991
- Area code: 507
- GNIS feature ID: 654951

South Troy is an unincorporated community in Zumbro Township, Wabasha County, Minnesota, United States. It is located on U.S. Highway 63 about 13 miles north of Rochester. Nearby places include Hammond, Zumbro Falls, Mazeppa, Potsdam, and Oronoco. Wabasha County Roads 7 and 11 are nearby.

South Troy had a post office from 1858 to 1903. Nearby Zumbro Falls was originally named Troy in the 1850s. The area south of Zumbro Falls to the Wabasha–Olmsted County line along U.S. 63 was named South Troy. The name of Troy was changed to Zumbro Falls after 1860 because there was already a community named Troy in southeast Minnesota at Winona County.

== Notable people ==
South Troy was known for being a home for Laura Ingalls Wilder, the writer of the Little House on the Prairie series of books, and her family for a short time in the summer of 1876. This is where Charles and Caroline Ingalls fourth child, and their only son, Charles Frederic 'Freddy' Ingalls (November 1, 1875 in Walnut Grove, Minnesota – August 27, 1876 in South Troy), died at the age of 10 months.
