= Chester Township, Indiana =

Chester Township is the name of two townships in the U.S. state of Indiana:

- Chester Township, Wabash County, Indiana
- Chester Township, Wells County, Indiana

See also: places named Chester Township (disambiguation).
