= Katherine Hancock Goode =

American educator and politician (1872–1928)

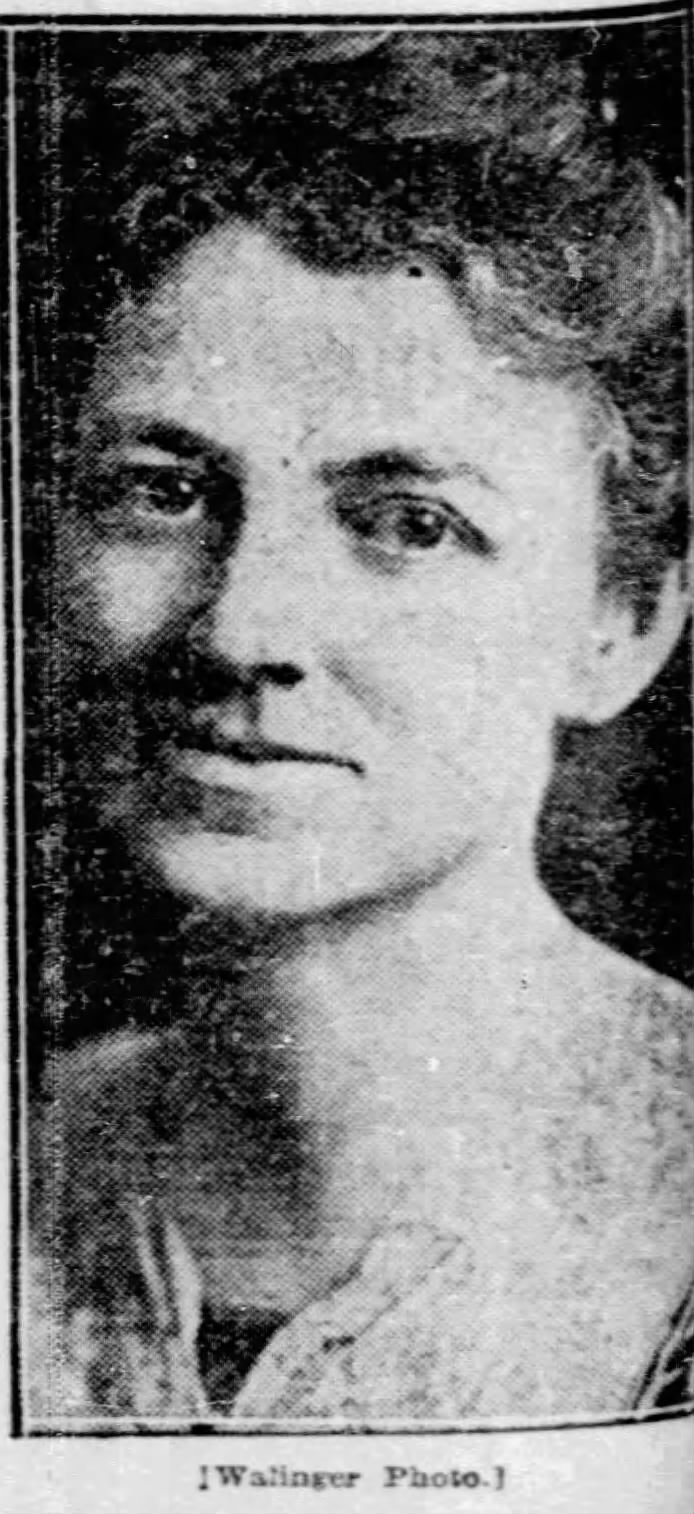
1924 or 1925 photo of Katherine Hancock Goode

Katherine Hancock Goode (1872–1928) was an American educator, administrator, and state legislator in Illinois. John Paul Goode (1852–1932), a professor of geography at the University of Chicago, was her husband. The Minnesota Historical Society has a photo of her and her husband.

She was born in Kellogg, Minnesota. She and Flora Sylvester Cheney were politically active. A park bench commemorates them.

Goode campaigned for civil rights including voting rights for women. She also advocated for an eight-hour workday, women on juries, and better conditions for incarcerated women.
