= Flora Cheney =

American politician

Flora Sylvester Cheney (March 11, 1872 – April 8, 1929) was an American activist and politician.

Cheney was born in Fond du Lac, Wisconsin. She went to the Fond du Lac public schools and taught school in Wisconsin. She married Dr. Henry W. Cheney, a physician from Chicago, Illinois.

Cheney was involved with the Illinois League of Women Voters. Cheney lived with her husband and family in Chicago. Cheney campaigned for her husband who won an alderman seat. She also campaigned for her longtime friend Katherine Hancock Goode, who won a seat in the state legislature. After Goode's death, Cheney served in the Illinois House of Representatives in 1929. While still in office, she died in a hospital in Chicago, Illinois, following a short illness. She was a Republican. A park bench commemorates Goode and Cheney.
