= Gillford Township, Wabasha County, Minnesota =

Gillford Township, Minnesota
- Township
- Location within the state of Minnesota Gillford Township, Minnesota (the United States)
- Coordinates: 44°19′43″N 92°22′14″W
- Country: United States
- State: Minnesota
- County: Wabasha

Area
  - Total: 35.4 sq mi (91.7 km^{2})
  - Land: 35.4 sq mi (91.7 km^{2})
  - Water: 0 sq mi (0.0 km^{2})
- Elevation: 1,053 ft (321 m)

Population (2020)
  - Total: 507
- Time zone: UTC-6 (Central (CST))
  - Summer (DST): UTC-5 (CDT)
- FIPS code: 27-23786
- GNIS feature ID: 0664270

Gillford Township is a township in Wabasha County, Minnesota, United States. The population was 507 at the 2020 census. The unincorporated community of Oak Center is located in the township.

== History ==
Gillford Township was organized in 1858, and named after a pioneer settler and his wife.

== Geography ==
According to the United States Census Bureau, the township has a total area of 35.4 square miles (92 km^{2}), all of it land.

== Demographics ==
As of the census of 2000, there were 581 people, 190 households, and 155 families residing in the township. The population density was 16.4 inhabitants per square mile (6.3/km^{2}). There were 195 housing units at an average density of 5.5 per square mile (2.1/km^{2}). The racial makeup of the township was 99.14% White and 0.86% Asian. Hispanic or Latino of any race were 0.17% of the population.

There were 190 households, out of which 45.8% had children under the age of 18 living with them, 71.6% were married couples living together, 4.2% had a female householder with no husband present, and 18.4% were non-families. 15.3% of all households were made up of individuals, and 4.2% had someone living alone who was 65 years of age or older. The average household size was 3.06 and the average family size was 3.43.

In the township the population was spread out, with 34.4% under the age of 18, 8.8% from 18 to 24, 25.1% from 25 to 44, 22.5% from 45 to 64, and 9.1% who were 65 years of age or older. The median age was 33 years. For every 100 females, there were 111.3 males. For every 100 females age 18 and over, there were 116.5 males.

The median income for a household in the township was $46,917, and the median income for a family was $51,389. Males had a median income of $31,932 versus $25,114 for females. The per capita income for the township was $16,473. About 8.1% of families and 6.7% of the population were below the poverty line, including 5.5% of those under age 18 and 11.3% of those age 65 or over.
