= Elgin Township, Wabasha County, Minnesota =

Elgin Township, Minnesota
- Township
- Location within the state of Minnesota Elgin Township, Minnesota (the United States)
- Coordinates: 44°8′37″N 92°14′58″W
- Country: United States
- State: Minnesota
- County: Wabasha

Area
  - Total: 35.0 sq mi (90.6 km^{2})
  - Land: 35.0 sq mi (90.6 km^{2})
  - Water: 0 sq mi (0.0 km^{2})
- Elevation: 1,096 ft (334 m)

Population (2000)
  - Total: 787
  - Density: 23/sq mi (8.7/km^{2})
- Time zone: UTC-6 (Central (CST))
  - Summer (DST): UTC-5 (CDT)
- ZIP code: 55932
- Area code: 507
- FIPS code: 27-18548
- GNIS feature ID: 0664064
- Website: https://www.elgintwp.us/

Elgin Township is a township in Wabasha County, Minnesota, United States. The population was 787 at the 2000 census.

Elgin Township was organized in 1858.

== Geography ==
According to the United States Census Bureau, the township has a total area of 35.0 square miles (91 km^{2}), all of it land.

== Demographics ==
As of the census of 2000, there were 787 people, 260 households, and 221 families residing in the township. The population density was 22.5 inhabitants per square mile (8.7/km^{2}). There were 268 housing units at an average density of 7.7 per square mile (3.0/km^{2}). The racial makeup of the township was 99.11% White, 0.13% Native American, 0.25% Asian, 0.25% from other races, and 0.25% from two or more races. Hispanic or Latino of any race were 0.64% of the population.

There were 260 households, out of which 44.2% had children under the age of 18 living with them, 78.5% were married couples living together, 3.8% had a female householder with no husband present, and 15.0% were non-families. 12.7% of all households were made up of individuals, and 3.8% had someone living alone who was 65 years of age or older. The average household size was 3.03 and the average family size was 3.33.

In the township the population was spread out, with 30.9% under the age of 18, 7.2% from 18 to 24, 28.1% from 25 to 44, 25.4% from 45 to 64, and 8.4% who were 65 years of age or older. The median age was 36 years. For every 100 females, there were 109.9 males. For every 100 females age 18 and over, there were 104.5 males.

The median income for a household in the township was $55,833, and the median income for a family was $58,000. Males had a median income of $35,227 versus $28,333 for females. The per capita income for the township was $19,928. None of the families and 0.6% of the population were living below the poverty line, including no under eighteens and 4.9% of those over 64.
