= Oak Center, Minnesota =

Unincorporated community in Minnesota, United States

Oak Center
- Unincorporated community
- Location within Minnesota Location within the United States
- Coordinates: 44°21′14″N 92°24′02″W
- Country: United States
- State: Minnesota
- County: Wabasha County
- Township: Gillford Township
- Elevation: 1,155 ft (352 m)
- Time zone: UTC-6 (Central (CST))
  - Summer (DST): UTC-5 (CDT)
- ZIP code: 55041
- Area codes: 651 and 507
- GNIS feature ID: 654855

Oak Center is an unincorporated community in Gillford Township, Wabasha County, Minnesota, United States.

== Geography ==
The community is located between Lake City and Zumbro Falls at the junction of Wabasha County Roads 31, 75, and 82; and U.S. Highway 63. County Roads 3, 16, and 33 are also in the immediate area. Nearby places include Lake City, Zumbro Falls, Bellechester, and Mazeppa.

== History ==
A post office was established at Oak Center in 1874, and remained in operation until 1907. The community was named for a grove of oak trees near the original town site.
