= Plainview Township, Wabasha County, Minnesota =

Plainview Township, Minnesota
- Township
- Location within the state of Minnesota Plainview Township, Minnesota (the United States)
- Coordinates: 44°8′22″N 92°8′54″W
- Country: United States
- State: Minnesota
- County: Wabasha

Area
  - Total: 33.4 sq mi (86.4 km^{2})
  - Land: 33.4 sq mi (86.4 km^{2})
  - Water: 0 sq mi (0.0 km^{2})
- Elevation: 1,112 ft (339 m)

Population (2000)
  - Total: 498
  - Density: 15/sq mi (5.8/km^{2})
- Time zone: UTC-6 (Central (CST))
  - Summer (DST): UTC-5 (CDT)
- ZIP code: 55964
- Area code: 507
- FIPS code: 27-51442
- GNIS feature ID: 0665315

Plainview Township is a township in Wabasha County, Minnesota, United States. The population was 498 at the 2000 census.

Plainview Township was organized in 1858, and named after its largest settlement, Plainview, Minnesota.

== Geography ==
According to the United States Census Bureau, the township has a total area of 33.4 square miles (86.4 km^{2}), all of it land.

== Demographics ==
As of the census of 2000, there were 498 people, 166 households, and 132 families residing in the township. The population density was 14.9 people per square mile (5.8/km^{2}). There were 176 housing units at an average density of 5.3/sq mi (2.0/km^{2}). The racial makeup of the township was 98.80% White, 1.20% from other races. Hispanic or Latino of any race were 1.81% of the population.

There were 166 households, out of which 45.2% had children under the age of 18 living with them, 70.5% were married couples living together, 5.4% had a female householder with no husband present, and 19.9% were non-families. 14.5% of all households were made up of individuals, and 9.0% had someone living alone who was 65 years of age or older. The average household size was 3.00 and the average family size was 3.38.

In the township the population was spread out, with 31.5% under the age of 18, 10.2% from 18 to 24, 27.5% from 25 to 44, 18.9% from 45 to 64, and 11.8% who were 65 years of age or older. The median age was 36 years. For every 100 females, there were 117.5 males. For every 100 females age 18 and over, there were 115.8 males.

The median income for a household in the township was $53,125, and the median income for a family was $59,167. Males had a median income of $33,958 versus $22,426 for females. The per capita income for the township was $19,778. About 1.5% of families and 2.4% of the population were below the poverty line, including 2.2% of those under age 18 and 2.9% of those age 65 or over.
