= Greenfield Township, Wabasha County, Minnesota =

Greenfield Township, Minnesota
- Township
- Location within the state of Minnesota Greenfield Township, Minnesota (the United States)
- Coordinates: 44°18′55″N 92°0′0″W
- Country: United States
- State: Minnesota
- County: Wabasha

Area
  - Total: 37.8 sq mi (98.0 km^{2})
  - Land: 33.0 sq mi (85.4 km^{2})
  - Water: 4.9 sq mi (12.6 km^{2})
- Elevation: 679 ft (207 m)

Population (2000)
  - Total: 1,254
  - Density: 38/sq mi (14.7/km^{2})
- Time zone: UTC-6 (Central (CST))
  - Summer (DST): UTC-5 (CDT)
- FIPS code: 27-25640
- GNIS feature ID: 0664339

Greenfield Township is a township in Wabasha County, Minnesota, United States. The population was 1,254 at the 2000 census.

Greenfield Township was organized in 1858.

== Geography ==
According to the United States Census Bureau, the township has a total area of 37.8 square miles (98 km^{2}); 33.0 square miles (85 km^{2}) is land and 4.9 square miles (13 km^{2}) (12.87%) is water.

== Demographics ==
At the 2000 census, there were 1,254 people, 516 households and 378 families residing in the township. The population density was 38.0 inhabitants per square mile (14.7/km^{2}). There were 720 housing units at an average density of 21.8/sq mi (8.4/km^{2}). The racial makeup of the township was 99.84% White, 0.08% Native American, and 0.08% from two or more races.

There were 516 households, of which 26.2% had children under the age of 18 living with them, 66.7% were married couples living together, 3.9% had a female householder with no husband present, and 26.7% were non-families. 22.1% of all households were made up of individuals, and 9.5% had someone living alone who was 65 years of age or older. The average household size was 2.43 and the average family size was 2.84.

22.2% of the population were under the age of 18, 5.4% from 18 to 24, 22.6% from 25 to 44, 32.4% from 45 to 64, and 17.4% who were 65 years of age or older. The median age was 45 years. For every 100 females, there were 105.2 males. For every 100 females age 18 and over, there were 105.0 males.

The per capita income for the township was $25,610. Females had a median income of $28,333. Males had a median income of $32,841.

The median household income was $44,643 and the median family income was $52,500.

Approximately 1.9% of families and 3.4% of the population were below the poverty line, including none of those under age 18, but 10.2% of those age 65 or over.
