= West Newton, Wabasha County, Minnesota =

Unincorporated community in Minnesota, United States

West Newton
- Unincorporated community
- Location within Minnesota Location within the United States
- Coordinates: 44°15′54″N 91°54′03″W
- Country: United States
- State: Minnesota
- County: Wabasha
- Elevation: 666 ft (203 m)
- Time zone: UTC-6 (Central (CST))
  - Summer (DST): UTC-5 (CDT)
- Area code: 651
- GNIS feature ID: 655004

West Newton is an unincorporated community in Wabasha County, Minnesota, United States.
