= Watopa Township, Wabasha County, Minnesota =

Watopa Township, Minnesota
- Township
- Location within the state of Minnesota Watopa Township, Minnesota (the United States)
- Coordinates: 44°15′1″N 91°59′59″W
- Country: United States
- State: Minnesota
- County: Wabasha

Area
  - Total: 35.6 sq mi (92.3 km^{2})
  - Land: 35.4 sq mi (91.7 km^{2})
  - Water: 0.23 sq mi (0.6 km^{2})
- Elevation: 778 ft (237 m)

Population (2000)
  - Total: 265
  - Density: 7.5/sq mi (2.9/km^{2})
- Time zone: UTC-6 (Central (CST))
  - Summer (DST): UTC-5 (CDT)
- FIPS code: 27-68638
- GNIS feature ID: 0665935

Watopa Township is a township in Wabasha County, Minnesota, United States. The population was 265 at the 2000 census.

== History ==
Watopa Township was organized in 1858, and named for the Dakota-language word meaning "paddle a canoe".

== Geography ==
According to the United States Census Bureau, the township has a total area of 35.6 square miles (92.3 km^{2}); 35.4 square miles (91.7 km^{2}) of it is land and 0.2 square miles (0.6 km^{2}) of it (0.62%) is water.

== Demographics ==
As of the census of 2000, there were 265 people, 95 households, and 72 families residing in the township. The population density was 7.5 people per square mile (2.9/km^{2}). There were 102 housing units at an average density of 2.9/sq mi (1.1/km^{2}). The racial makeup of the township was 100.00% White. Hispanic or Latino of any race were 1.13% of the population.

There were 95 households, out of which 35.8% had children under the age of 18 living with them, 70.5% were married couples living together, 3.2% had a female householder with no husband present, and 23.2% were non-families. 18.9% of all households were made up of individuals, and 5.3% had someone living alone who was 65 years of age or older. The average household size was 2.79 and the average family size was 3.25.

In the township the population was spread out, with 28.7% under the age of 18, 7.9% from 18 to 24, 24.9% from 25 to 44, 30.6% from 45 to 64, and 7.9% who were 65 years of age or older. The median age was 38 years. For every 100 females, there were 119.0 males. For every 100 females age 18 and over, there were 125.0 males.

The median income for a household in the township was $47,813, and the median income for a family was $66,042. Males had a median income of $34,063 versus $22,083 for females. The per capita income for the township was $21,418. About 4.8% of families and 2.6% of the population were below the poverty line, including none of those under the age of eighteen and 8.7% of those 65 or over.
