= Walnut Street Bridge (Mazeppa, Minnesota) =

- U.S. National Register of Historic Places
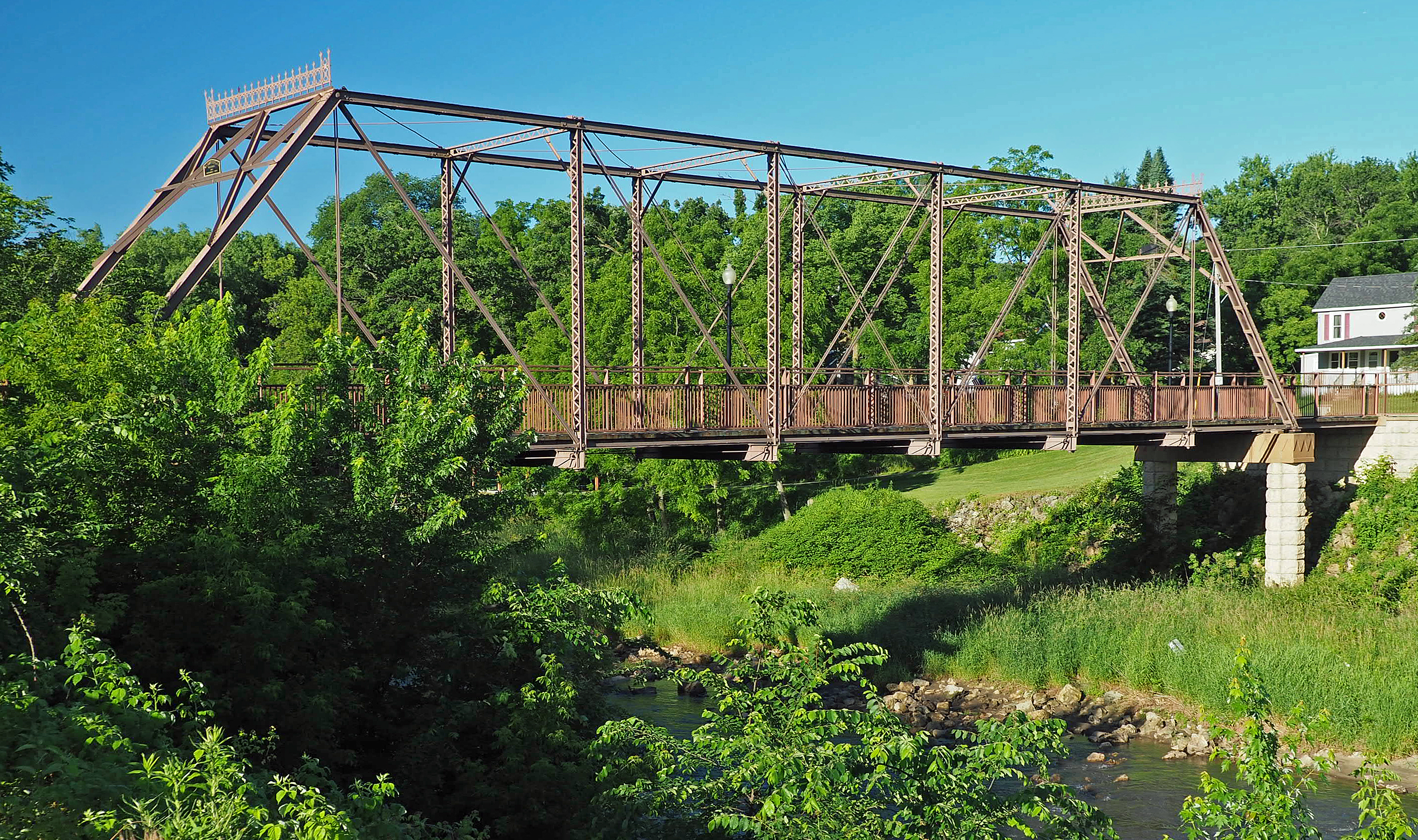
- The Walnut Street Bridge from the northeast

- Location within Minnesota Location within the United States
- Location: West end of Walnut Street, Mazeppa, Minnesota
- Coordinates: 44°16′22.8″N 92°32′54.5″W
- Area: Less than one acre
- Built: 1904
- Architect: W. S. Hewett Co.
- Architectural style: Pratt through truss
- MPS: Iron and Steel Bridges in Minnesota
- NRHP reference No.: 02001705
- Designated: January 15, 2003

The Walnut Street Bridge is a historic Pratt through truss bridge over the North Fork of the Zumbro River in Mazeppa, Minnesota, United States. It was built as a highway bridge in 1904 but has been restricted to pedestrian use since 1980. It was listed on the National Register of Historic Places in 2003 for having local significance in the theme of engineering. It was nominated for being the work of noted Minnesota engineer William S. Hewett and his bridge building firm the W. S. Hewett Co., an example further recognized for its exceptional ornamentation.

== History ==
A previous bridge at this location, dating to the 19th century, was Mazeppa's only crossing over the Zumbro River and a link on a key road between Rochester and Lake City, Minnesota. That bridge was condemned in 1901 but remained in use until the Mazeppa village council contracted with the W. S. Hewett Co. in 1904 for a replacement, selling bonds to help raise some of the $3,775 cost. The new bridge was completed in August of that year. As such it fell within a unique window in Minnesota bridge construction: in the prior decade steel had supplanted iron as the construction material of choice, but in 1911 the recently formed Minnesota State Highway Commission would enact standards that led to far greater similarity in bridge designs.

The Walnut Street Bridge remained Mazeppa's primary river crossing until 1922, when a new highway bridge was built one block to the north. The Walnut Street Bridge continued to carry local traffic until 1980, when it was closed to vehicles. It served as a pedestrian bridge but was closed altogether in 1995. The city of Mazeppa rehabilitated the bridge from 2001 to 2002, removing non-historic elements, replacing deteriorated structures, and adding new safety features. The rehabilitation project reopened the bridge to pedestrian use and won an award from the Preservation Alliance of Minnesota.

== See also ==
- List of bridges on the National Register of Historic Places in Minnesota
- National Register of Historic Places listings in Wabasha County, Minnesota
