= 4th U.S. Artillery, Battery K =

4th U.S. Light Artillery, Battery "K"
- Active: 1861 - 1865
- Country: United States
- Allegiance: Union
- Branch: Field Artillery Branch (United States)
- Engagements: Siege of Yorktown; Seven Days Battles; Battle of Fredericksburg; Battle of Chancellorsville; Battle of Gettysburg; Bristoe Campaign; Battle of the Wilderness; Battle of Spotsylvania Court House; Battle of Cold Harbor; Siege of Petersburg; Battle of Jerusalem Plank Road; First Battle of Deep Bottom; Battle of Boydton Plank Road; Appomattox Campaign; Battle of Sailor's Creek; Battle of Appomattox Court House

Commanders
- Notable commanders: Francis W. Seeley

Battery "K" 4th Regiment of Artillery was a light artillery battery that served in the Union Army during the American Civil War.

== Service ==
The battery was attached to Artillery Reserve, Army of the Potomac, August 1861 to June 1862. Artillery Reserve, III Corps, Army of the Potomac, to August 1862. Artillery, 2nd Division, III Corps, to May 1863. Artillery Brigade, III Corps, to March 1864. Artillery Brigade, II Corps, to June 1865. Department of Washington, D.C., to August 1865.

== Detailed service ==
Moved to Washington, D.C., August 1861, and duty there until March 1862. Ordered to the Virginia Peninsula March 1862. Siege of Yorktown, Va., April 5-May 4. Seven days before Richmond June 25-July 1. Oak Grove June 25. Glendale and Brackett's June 30. Malvern Hill July 1 and August 5. Moved to Alexandria August 16–23, and duty there until November. Operations on Orange & Alexandria Railroad November 10–12. Battle of Fredericksburg, Va., December 12–15. Operations at Rappahannock Bridge and Grove Church February 5–7, 1863. Chancellorsville Campaign April 27-May 6. Battle of Chancellorsville May 1–5. Gettysburg Campaign June 11-July 24. Wapping Heights, Manassas Gap, July 23. Bristoe Campaign October 9–22. McLean's Ford, Bull Run, October 15. Advance to the Rappahannock November 7–8. Kelly's Ford November 7. Payne's Farm November 27. Demonstration on the Rapidan February 6–7, 1864. Rapidan Campaign May 4-June 12. Wilderness May 5–7. Spotsylvania Court House May 8–21. Assault on the Salient May 12. North Anna River May 22–26. On line of the Pamunkey May 26–28. Totopotomoy May 28–31. Cold Harbor June 1–12. Before Petersburg June 16–18. Siege of Petersburg June 16, 1864 to April 2, 1865. Jerusalem Plank Road June 22, 1864. Deep Bottom July 27–29. Strawberry Plains August 14–18. Hatcher's Run October 27–28. Warren's Raid on Weldon Railroad December 7–14. Dabney's Mills, Hatcher's Run, February 5–7, 1865. Watkins' House March 25. Appomattox Campaign March 28-April 9. Hatcher's Run, Boydton Road, March 30–31. White Oak Road March 31. Sutherland Station April 2. Sailor's Creek April 6. High Bridge April 7. Appomattox Court House April 9. Surrender of Lee and his army. Marched to Washington, D.C., May. Grand Review of the Armies May 23. Duty in the defenses of Washington until August 1865.

== Commanders ==
- Lieutenant Francis W. Seeley
- Lieutenant Robert James - commanded at the Battle of Gettysburg after Lt Seely was wounded in action on July 2

== See also ==
- List of United States Regular Army Civil War units
- 4th Air Defense Artillery Regiment
