= Theilman, Minnesota =

Unincorporated community in Minnesota, United States

Theilman
- Unincorporated community
- Location within Minnesota Location within the United States
- Coordinates: 44°17′21″N 92°11′32″W
- Country: United States
- State: Minnesota
- County: Wabasha County
- Township: West Albany Township and Glasgow Township
- Elevation: 771 ft (235 m)
- Time zone: UTC-6 (Central (CST))
  - Summer (DST): UTC-5 (CDT)
- ZIP code: 55945
- Area code: 507
- GNIS feature ID: 653123

Theilman is an unincorporated community in Wabasha County, Minnesota, United States.

== Geography ==
Theilman is located within West Albany Township and Glasgow Township, at the junction of Wabasha County Roads 4 and 86. Theilman is located along the Zumbro River and near the center of Wabasha County. It lies one mile southwest of the Zumbro Bottoms units of the Richard J. Dorer Memorial Hardwood State Forest. Other nearby places include Kellogg, Plainview, Millville, Zumbro Falls, and Wabasha.

== Climate ==
According to the Köppen Climate Classification system, Theilman has a hot-summer humid continental climate, abbreviated "Dfa" on climate maps. The hottest temperature recorded in Theilman was 104 °F (40.0 °C) on August 1, 1988 and September 5, 2023, while the coldest temperature recorded was −44 °F (−42.2 °C) on January 18, 1967.

Climate data for Theilman, Minnesota, 1991–2020 normals, extremes 1962–present
Month	Jan	Feb	Mar	Apr	May	Jun	Jul	Aug	Sep	Oct	Nov	Dec	Year
Record high °F (°C)	57 (14)	70 (21)	84 (29)	95 (35)	99 (37)	103 (39)	103 (39)	104 (40)	104 (40)	94 (34)	79 (26)	64 (18)	104 (40)
Mean maximum °F (°C)	43.0 (6.1)	47.5 (8.6)	64.9 (18.3)	79.1 (26.2)	88.3 (31.3)	93.3 (34.1)	93.4 (34.1)	92.3 (33.5)	88.5 (31.4)	81.6 (27.6)	64.3 (17.9)	47.2 (8.4)	95.5 (35.3)
Mean daily maximum °F (°C)	24.4 (−4.2)	29.7 (−1.3)	41.6 (5.3)	56.7 (13.7)	69.0 (20.6)	79.0 (26.1)	83.1 (28.4)	81.0 (27.2)	73.6 (23.1)	59.7 (15.4)	43.4 (6.3)	30.0 (−1.1)	55.9 (13.3)
Daily mean °F (°C)	14.3 (−9.8)	18.7 (−7.4)	31.4 (−0.3)	45.1 (7.3)	57.2 (14.0)	67.7 (19.8)	71.7 (22.1)	69.5 (20.8)	61.4 (16.3)	47.9 (8.8)	34.0 (1.1)	21.4 (−5.9)	45.0 (7.2)
Mean daily minimum °F (°C)	4.2 (−15.4)	7.6 (−13.6)	21.2 (−6.0)	33.4 (0.8)	45.3 (7.4)	56.5 (13.6)	60.3 (15.7)	58.0 (14.4)	49.1 (9.5)	36.1 (2.3)	24.5 (−4.2)	12.8 (−10.7)	34.1 (1.1)
Mean minimum °F (°C)	−21.3 (−29.6)	−15.8 (−26.6)	−3.8 (−19.9)	17.0 (−8.3)	28.9 (−1.7)	41.2 (5.1)	48.5 (9.2)	45.5 (7.5)	32.6 (0.3)	21.2 (−6.0)	6.8 (−14.0)	−12.9 (−24.9)	−24.9 (−31.6)
Record low °F (°C)	−44 (−42)	−40 (−40)	−28 (−33)	−1 (−18)	15 (−9)	32 (0)	39 (4)	32 (0)	22 (−6)	7 (−14)	−17 (−27)	−38 (−39)	−44 (−42)
Average precipitation inches (mm)	1.00 (25)	1.11 (28)	1.99 (51)	3.39 (86)	4.38 (111)	5.30 (135)	4.19 (106)	4.68 (119)	3.75 (95)	2.46 (62)	1.97 (50)	1.25 (32)	35.47 (900)
Average snowfall inches (cm)	9.9 (25)	12.1 (31)	9.0 (23)	2.7 (6.9)	0.0 (0.0)	0.0 (0.0)	0.0 (0.0)	0.0 (0.0)	0.0 (0.0)	0.6 (1.5)	2.3 (5.8)	11.7 (30)	48.3 (123.2)
Average precipitation days (≥ 0.01 in)	5.9	5.5	7.0	8.6	10.7	11.1	7.8	8.1	7.5	7.2	5.7	6.9	92.0
Average snowy days (≥ 0.1 in)	5.2	4.8	3.4	1.0	0.0	0.0	0.0	0.0	0.0	0.2	1.5	5.1	21.2
Source 1: NOAA
Source 2: National Weather Service

== History ==
A post office called Theilmann was established in 1904, and remained in operation until 1996. The community was named for Christian Theilmann, the original owner of the town site.
