= Silver Lake, Indiana =

- Town
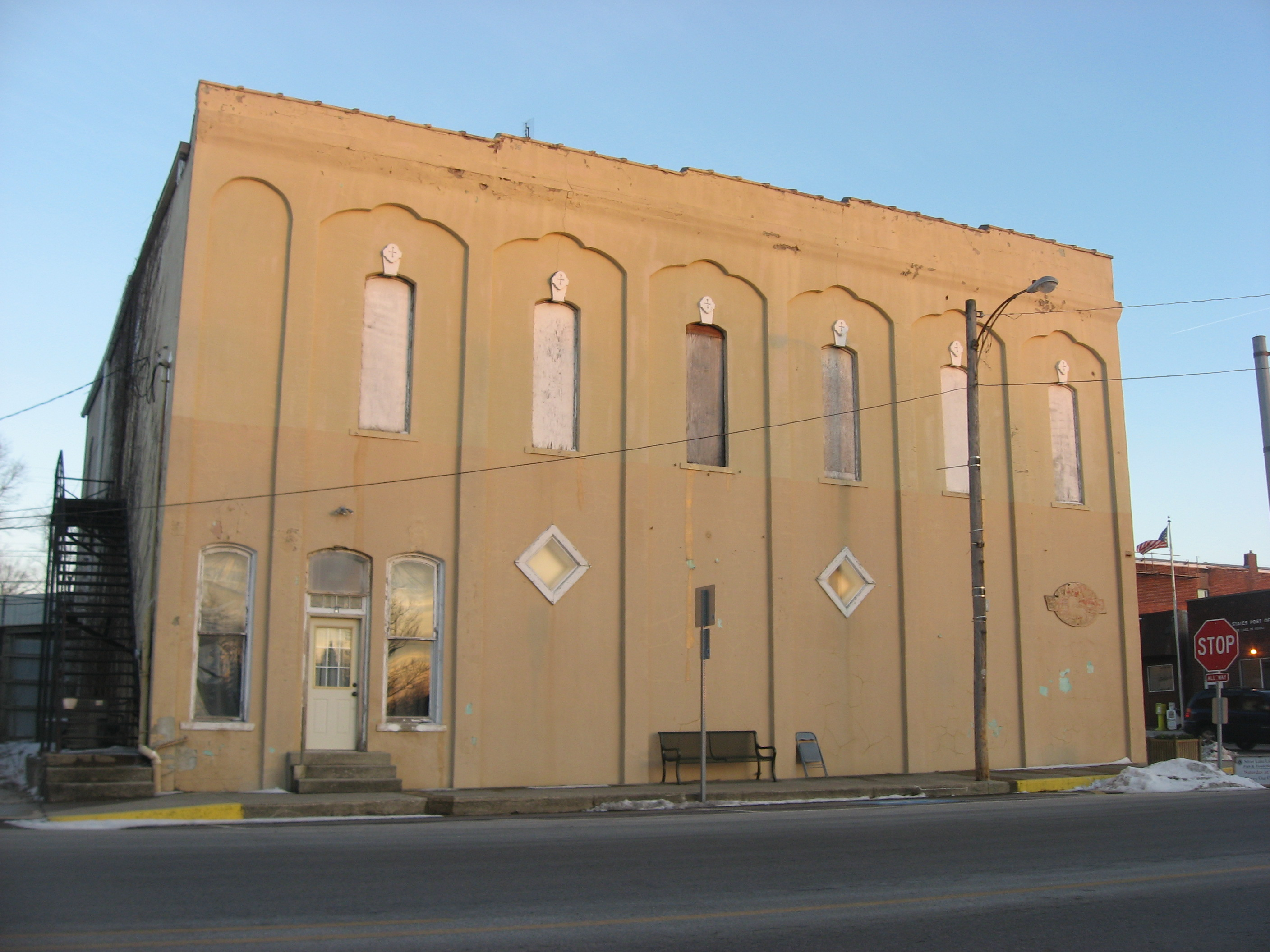
- Downtown buildings

- Location of Silver Lake in Kosciusko County, Indiana.
- Coordinates: 41°04′27″N 85°53′32″W
- Country: United States
- State: Indiana
- County: Kosciusko
- Township: Lake

Area
  - Total: 0.54 sq mi (1.39 km^{2})
  - Land: 0.53 sq mi (1.38 km^{2})
  - Water: 0 sq mi (0.00 km^{2})
- Elevation: 899 ft (274 m)

Population (2020)
  - Total: 875
  - Density: 1,637.1/sq mi (632.08/km^{2})
- Time zone: UTC-5 (Eastern (EST))
  - Summer (DST): UTC-4 (EDT)
- ZIP code: 46982
- Area code: 260
- FIPS code: 18-69768
- GNIS feature ID: 2397664
- Website: townofsilverlake.com

Silver Lake is a town in Lake Township, Kosciusko County, in the U.S. state of Indiana. The population was 875 at the 2020 census.

== History ==
Silver Lake was originally called Silver Lakeville, and under the latter name was platted in 1859. The community's location near Silver Lake caused the name to be selected. The post office at Silver Lake has been in operation since 1854.

The Silver Lake Historic District was listed on the National Register of Historic Places in 1992.

== Geography ==
According to the 2010 census, Silver Lake has a total area of 0.531 square miles (1.38 km^{2}), of which 0.53 square miles (1.37 km^{2}) (or 99.81%) is land and 0.001 square miles (0.00 km^{2}) (or 0.19%) is water.

== Demographics ==
Historical population
Census	Pop.	Note	%±
1880	534		—
1890	570		6.7%
1900	504		−11.6%
1910	493		−2.2%
1920	452		−8.3%
1930	442		−2.2%
1940	471		6.6%
1950	472		0.2%
1960	514		8.9%
1970	588		14.4%
1980	576		−2.0%
1990	528		−8.3%
2000	546		3.4%
2010	915		67.6%
2020	875		−4.4%
U.S. Decennial Census

=== 2010 census ===
As of the census of 2010, there were 915 people, 366 households, and 244 families living in the town. The population density was 1,726.4 inhabitants per square mile (666.6/km^{2}). There were 475 housing units at an average density of 896.2 per square mile (346.0/km^{2}). The racial makeup of the town was 97.7% White, 0.9% African American, 0.2% Native American, 0.2% Asian, 0.1% from other races, and 0.9% from two or more races. Hispanic or Latino of any race were 1.9% of the population.

There were 366 households, of which 32.5% had children under the age of 18 living with them, 48.6% were married couples living together, 11.7% had a female householder with no husband present, 6.3% had a male householder with no wife present, and 33.3% were non-families. 26.2% of all households were made up of individuals, and 8.5% had someone living alone who was 65 years of age or older. The average household size was 2.46 and the average family size was 2.91.

The median age in the town was 38.1 years. 23.5% of residents were under the age of 18; 8.1% were between the ages of 18 and 24; 27.5% were from 25 to 44; 27.1% were from 45 to 64; and 13.6% were 65 years of age or older. The gender makeup of the town was 46.9% male and 53.1% female.

=== 2000 census ===
As of the census of 2000, there were 546 people, 207 households, and 156 families living in the town. The population density was 1,874.9 inhabitants per square mile (723.9/km^{2}). There were 221 housing units at an average density of 758.9 per square mile (293.0/km^{2}). The racial makeup of the town was 95.79% White, 0.37% Native American, 0.18% Asian, 2.75% from other races, and 0.92% from two or more races. Hispanic or Latino of any race were 3.48% of the population.

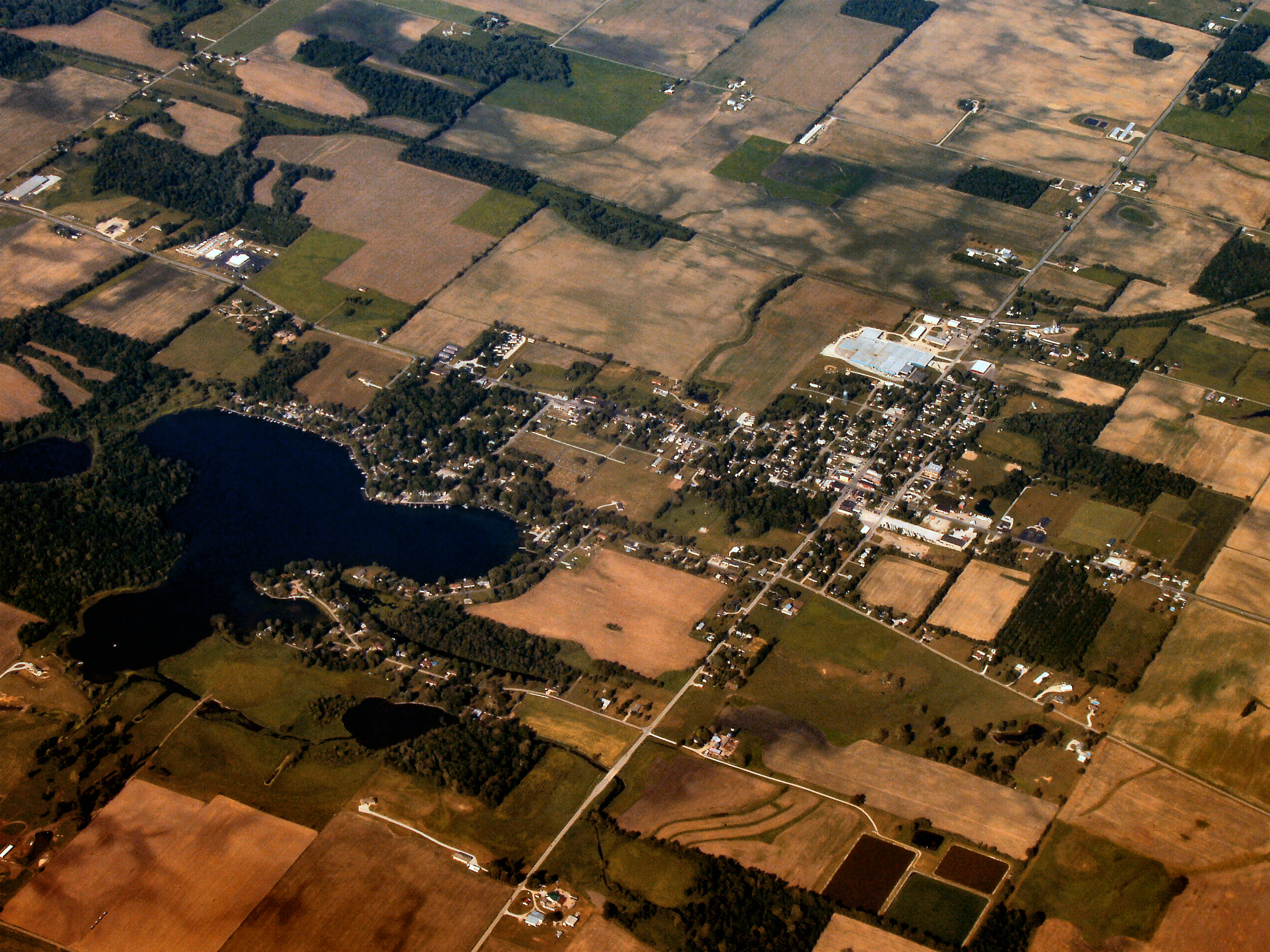
Silver Lake from the air.

There were 207 households, out of which 35.7% had children under the age of 18 living with them, 59.9% were married couples living together, 9.7% had a female householder with no husband present, and 24.6% were non-families. 18.8% of all households were made up of individuals, and 8.2% had someone living alone who was 65 years of age or older. The average household size was 2.64 and the average family size was 2.97.

In the town, the population was spread out, with 27.3% under the age of 18, 6.6% from 18 to 24, 29.3% from 25 to 44, 22.9% from 45 to 64, and 13.9% who were 65 years of age or older. The median age was 36 years. For every 100 females, there were 88.3 males. For every 100 females age 18 and over, there were 90.9 males.

The median income for a household in the town was $33,088, and the median income for a family was $36,875. Males had a median income of $31,442 versus $21,000 for females. The per capita income for the town was $13,561. About 9.4% of families and 12.1% of the population were below the poverty line, including 14.5% of those under age 18 and 10.2% of those age 65 or over.
