= West Albany, Minnesota =

Unincorporated community in Minnesota, United States

West Albany
- Unincorporated community
- Location within Minnesota Location within the United States
- Coordinates: 44°18′05″N 92°17′08″W
- Country: United States
- State: Minnesota
- County: Wabasha County
- Township: West Albany Township
- Elevation: 820 ft (250 m)
- Time zone: UTC-6 (Central (CST))
  - Summer (DST): UTC-5 (CDT)
- ZIP code: 55041 and 55957
- Area code: 507
- GNIS feature ID: 655003

West Albany is an unincorporated community in West Albany Township, Wabasha County, Minnesota, United States.

== Geography ==
The community is located between Zumbro Falls and Wabasha along State Highway 60 (MN 60) near the intersection with 310th Avenue. Spring Creek and West Albany Creek meet at West Albany. The Zumbro River is nearby. Nearby places include Millville, Lake City, Zumbro Falls, Theilman, and Wabasha.

== History ==
West Albany was platted in 1857, and named after Albany, New York, the native home of a large share of the first settlers. A post office called West Albany was established in 1857, and remained in operation until 1881.
