= Louisburg, Minnesota =

Hamlet in Minnesota, United States

Louisburg
- Hamlet
- Location of Louisburg, Minnesota
- Coordinates: 45°09′52″N 96°10′16″W
- Country: United States
- State: Minnesota
- County: Lac qui Parle

Area
  - Total: 0.25 sq mi (0.66 km^{2})
  - Land: 0.25 sq mi (0.66 km^{2})
  - Water: 0 sq mi (0.00 km^{2})
- Elevation: 1,040 ft (320 m)

Population (2020)
  - Total: 31
  - Density: 122.0/sq mi (47.11/km^{2})
- Time zone: UTC-6 (Central (CST))
  - Summer (DST): UTC-5 (CDT)
- ZIP code: 56256
- Area code: 320
- FIPS code: 27-38258
- GNIS feature ID: 2395769

Louisburg is a city in Lac qui Parle County, Minnesota, United States. The population was 31 at the 2020 census.

== History ==
Louisburg was platted in 1887. A post office was established at Louisburg in 1888, and remained in operation until it was discontinued in 1992.

== Geography ==
According to the United States Census Bureau, the town has a total area of 0.30 square miles (0.78 km^{2}), all land.

== Demographics ==
Historical population
Census	Pop.	Note	%±
1910	88		—
1920	99		12.5%
1930	77		−22.2%
1940	94		22.1%
1950	93		−1.1%
1960	91		−2.2%
1970	75		−17.6%
1980	52		−30.7%
1990	42		−19.2%
2000	26		−38.1%
2010	47		80.8%
2020	31		−34.0%
U.S. Decennial Census

=== 2010 census ===
As of the census of 2010, there were 47 people, 18 households, and 16 families living in the community. The population density was 156.7 inhabitants per square mile (60.5/km^{2}). There were 30 housing units at an average density of 100.0 per square mile (38.6/km^{2}). The racial makeup of Louisburg was 93.6% White, 4.3% Asian, and 2.1% from other races. Hispanic or Latino of any race were 2.1% of the population.

There were 18 households, of which 33.3% had children under the age of 18 living with them, 72.2% were married couples living together, 16.7% had a female householder with no husband present, and 11.1% were non-families. 11.1% of all households were made up of individuals, and 11.2% had someone living alone who was 65 years of age or older. The average household size was 2.61 and the average family size was 2.81.

The median age in the community was 46.3 years. 27.7% of residents were under the age of 18; 8.4% were between the ages of 18 and 24; 12.8% were from 25 to 44; 34.1% were from 45 to 64; and 17% were 65 years of age or older. The gender makeup was 46.8% male and 53.2% female.

=== 2000 census ===
At the 2000 census, there were 26 people, 13 households and 7 families living in the community. The population density was 85.0 inhabitants per square mile (32.8/km^{2}). There were 29 housing units at an average density of 94.8 per square mile (36.6/km^{2}). The racial makeup of the hamlet was 96.15% White and 3.85% Asian.

There were 13 households, of which 23.1% had children under the age of 18 living with them, 61.5% were married couples living together, and 38.5% were non-families. 38.5% of all households were made up of individuals, and 15.4% had someone living alone who was 65 years of age or older. The average household size was 2.00 and the average family size was 2.63.

19.2% of the population was under the age of 18, 15.4% from 25 to 44, 26.9% from 45 to 64, and 38.5% who were 65 years of age or older. The median age was 52 years. For every 100 females, there were 136.4 males. For every 100 females age 18 and over, there were 110.0 males.

The median household income was $18,750, and the median family income was $24,375. Males had a median income of $25,417 versus $35,625 for females. The per capita income for residents of Louisburg was $14,535. None of the population or the families were below the poverty line.
