= Silver Lake Historic District (Silver Lake, Indiana) =

Historic district in Indiana, United States

- U.S. National Register of Historic Places
- U.S. Historic district
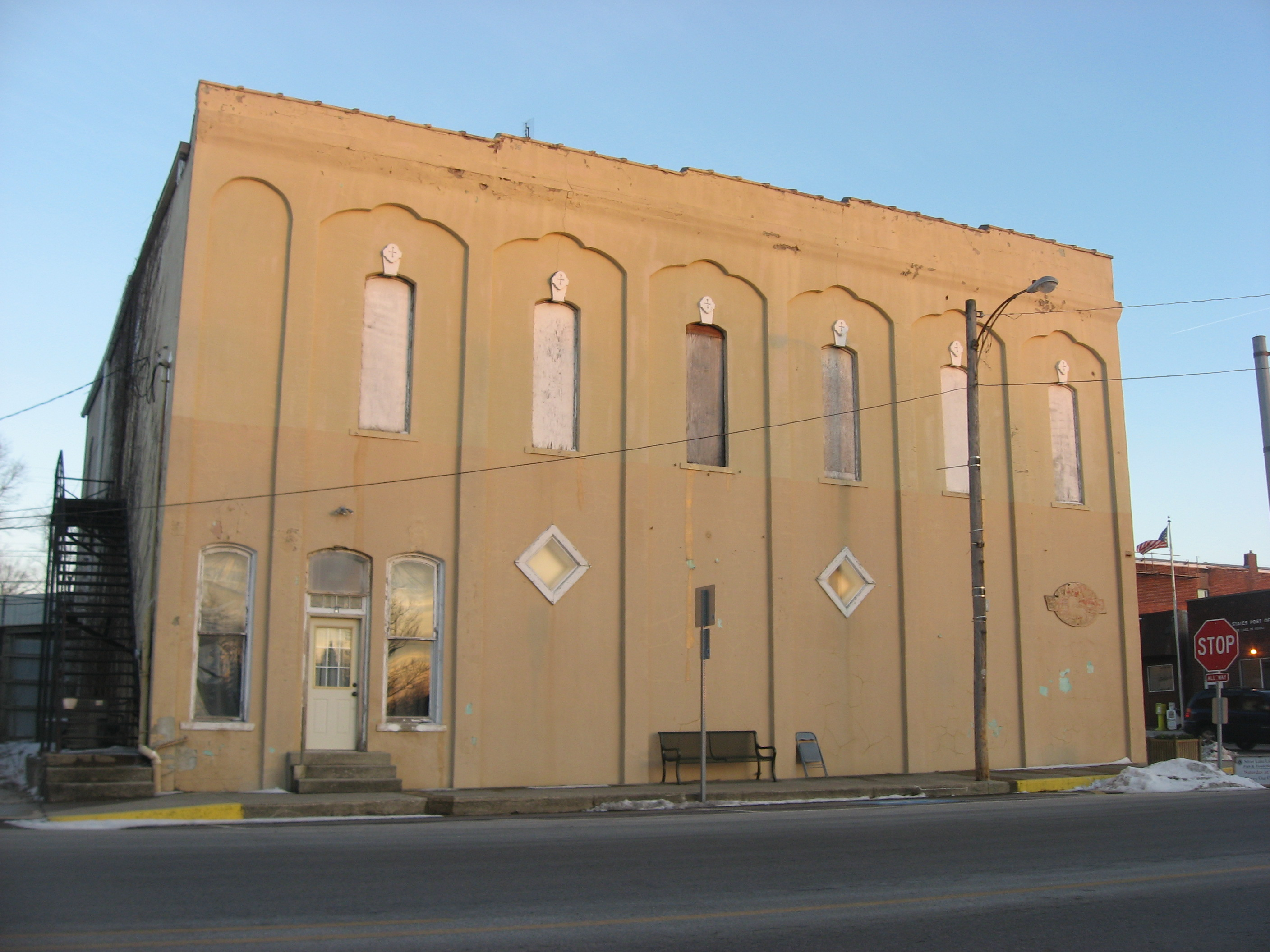
- 101 E. Main in Silver Lake, January 2013

- Location within Indiana Location within the United States
- Location: 100 blocks of N. and S. Jefferson and E. and W. Main Sts., Silver Lake, Indiana
- Coordinates: 41°04′19″N 85°53′32″W
- Area: 3.4 acres (1.4 ha)
- Architectural style: Chicago, Late Victorian, The Commercial Style
- NRHP reference No.: 92001148
- Added to NRHP: September 4, 1992

Silver Lake Historic District is a national historic district located at Silver Lake, Indiana. The district encompasses 19 contributing buildings in the central business district and surrounding residential section of Silver Lake. It developed between about 1865 and 1920, and includes notable examples of Italianate, Romanesque Revival, Classical Revival, and Early Commercial style architecture. Notable buildings include the former Enos Hotel (c. 1915), Municipal Building (c. 1910), and buildings on North Jefferson and East Main streets.

It was listed on the National Register of Historic Places in 1992.
