= Wabasha County, Minnesota =

County in Minnesota, United States

- County
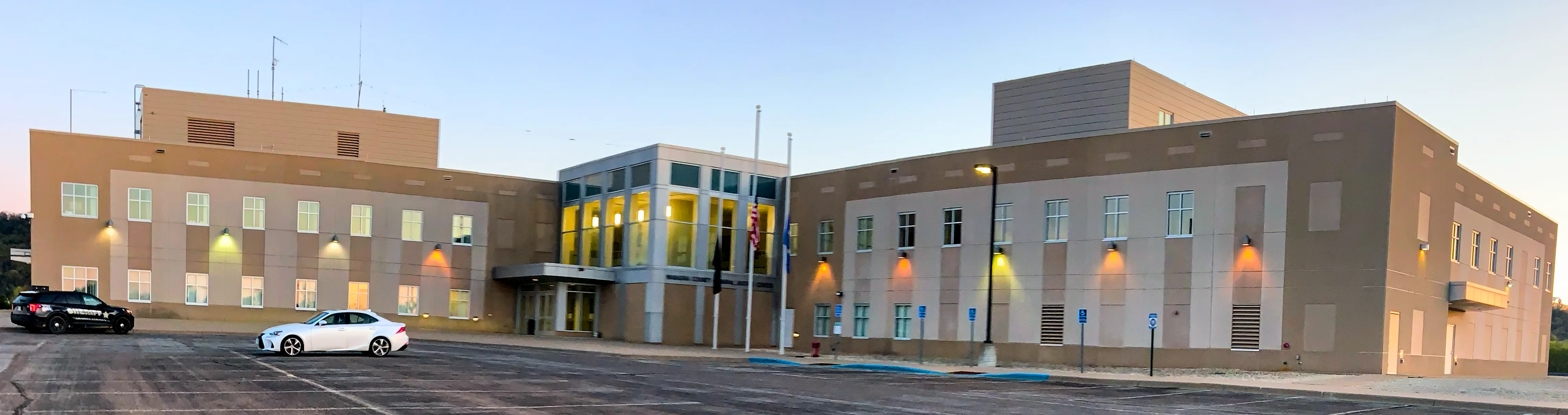
- Wabasha County Courthouse

- Location within the U.S. state of Minnesota
- Coordinates: 44°17′N 92°14′W
- Country: United States
- State: Minnesota
- Founded: October 27, 1849
- Named for: Wabasha (city)
- Seat: Wabasha
- Largest city: Lake City

Area
  - Total: 550 sq mi (1,400 km^{2})
  - Land: 523 sq mi (1,350 km^{2})
  - Water: 27 sq mi (70 km^{2}) 4.8%

Population (2020)
  - Total: 21,387
  - Estimate (2025): 21,537 ▲
  - Density: 40.9/sq mi (15.8/km^{2})
- Time zone: UTC−6 (Central)
  - Summer (DST): UTC−5 (CDT)
- Congressional district: 2nd
- Website: www.co.wabasha.mn.us

Wabasha County is a county in the U.S. state of Minnesota. As of the 2020 census, the population was 21,387. Its county seat is Wabasha.

Wabasha County is part of the Rochester, Minnesota, metropolitan area.

== History ==
The recently organized Minnesota Territory legislature created Wabasha County on October 27, 1849, one of nine original counties in the territory. An area on the Mississippi River's west bank, originally called Cratte's Landing, had grown into a town named Wabasha, then a city, and when the legislature created the county west of the river around this city, Wabasha was designated the county seat. The city had been named for three successive chiefs of Mississippi bands of Dakota Indians.

Wabasha County's area was reduced in 1853 when sections were partitioned off to create Fillmore, Goodhue, and Rice counties. More area was partitioned off in 1854 to create Winona County, and another part in 1855 to create Olmsted County. The county boundaries have remained the same since 1855.

== Geography ==
Soils of Wabasha County

Wabasha County lies on Minnesota's border with Wisconsin (across the Mississippi River. The Mississippi flows southeast along the county's eastern line. The North Fork of the Whitewater River flows east through the southern part of the county, then discharges into the Whitewater in Olmsted County. The combined Whitewater then enters the southeastern part of Wabasha County, flowing northeast to its discharge point into the Mississippi. The Zumbro River flows east-northeast through the county to its discharge point into the Mississippi. East Indian Creek and Miller Creek drain the northern part of the county into the Mississippi. The county terrain consists of low rolling hills, considerably rutted by drainages, with all available area devoted to agriculture. The terrain slopes to the east and south, with its highest point on its upper west border at 1,191 ft (363 m) ASL. The county has a total area of 550 square miles (1,400 km^{2}), of which 523 square miles (1,350 km^{2}) is land and 27 square miles (70 km^{2}) (4.8%) is water. Wabasha is one of 17 Minnesota counties with more savanna soils than either forest or prairie soils.

=== Major highways ===
- U.S. Highway 61
- U.S. Highway 63
- Minnesota State Highway 42
- Minnesota State Highway 60
- Minnesota State Highway 74
- Minnesota State Highway 247

=== Adjacent counties ===
- Pepin County, Wisconsin - northeast
- Buffalo County, Wisconsin - east
- Winona County - southeast
- Olmsted County - south
- Goodhue County - west, northwest

=== Protected areas ===
- Carley State Park
- Kellogg-Weaver Dunes Scientific and Natural Area
- Mazeppa State Wildlife Management Area
- McCarthy Lake State Wildlife Management Area
- Miller Creek Aquatic Management Area
- Zumbro Falls Woods Scientific and Natural Area

=== Lakes ===
- Lake Pepin (part)
- Robinson Lake
- Zumbro Lake (part)
- These lakes are located within the Upper Mississippi River National Wildlife and Fish Refuge
  - Cross Lake
  - Half Moon Lake
  - Maloney Lake
  - McCarthy Lake
  - Peterson Lake
  - Robinson Lake

== Demographics ==
Historical population
Census	Pop.	Note	%±
1850	243		—
1860	7,228		2,874.5%
1870	15,850		119.3%
1880	18,206		14.9%
1890	16,972		−6.8%
1900	18,924		11.5%
1910	18,554		−2.0%
1920	17,919		−3.4%
1930	19,613		9.5%
1940	17,653		−10.0%
1950	16,878		−4.4%
1960	17,007		0.8%
1970	17,224		1.3%
1980	19,335		12.3%
1990	19,744		2.1%
2000	21,610		9.5%
2010	21,676		0.3%
2020	21,387		−1.3%
2025 (est.)	21,537	▲	0.7%
U.S. Decennial Census; 1790-1960 1900-1990; 1990-2000

=== Racial and ethnic composition ===
Wabasha County, Minnesota – Racial and ethnic composition Note: the US Census treats Hispanic/Latino as an ethnic category. This table excludes Latinos from the racial categories and assigns them to a separate category. Hispanics/Latinos may be of any race.
Race / Ethnicity (NH = Non-Hispanic)	Pop 1980	Pop 1990	Pop 2000	Pop 2010	Pop 2020	% 1980	% 1990	% 2000	% 2010	% 2020
White alone (NH)	19,204	19,518	20,968	20,712	19,921	99.32%	98.86%	97.03%	95.55%	93.15%
Black or African American alone (NH)	5	11	53	80	121	0.03%	0.06%	0.25%	0.37%	0.57%
Native American or Alaska Native alone (NH)	24	47	46	29	32	0.12%	0.24%	0.21%	0.13%	0.15%
Asian alone (NH)	38	89	93	93	97	0.20%	0.45%	0.43%	0.43%	0.45%
Native Hawaiian or Pacific Islander alone (NH)	x	x	0	1	6	x	x	0.00%	0.00%	0.03%
Other race alone (NH)	9	0	6	7	20	0.05%	0.00%	0.03%	0.03%	0.09%
Mixed race or Multiracial (NH)	x	x	80	162	482	x	x	0.37%	0.75%	2.25%
Hispanic or Latino (any race)	55	79	364	592	708	0.28%	0.40%	1.68%	2.73%	3.31%
Total	19,335	19,744	21,610	21,676	21,387	100.00%	100.00%	100.00%	100.00%	100.00%

=== 2020 census ===
As of the 2020 census, the county had a population of 21,387. The median age was 45.5 years. 21.7% of residents were under the age of 18 and 22.5% of residents were 65 years of age or older. For every 100 females there were 101.0 males, and for every 100 females age 18 and over there were 100.1 males age 18 and over.

The racial makeup of the county was 93.9% White, 0.6% Black or African American, 0.2% American Indian and Alaska Native, 0.5% Asian, <0.1% Native Hawaiian and Pacific Islander, 1.2% from some other race, and 3.5% from two or more races. Hispanic or Latino residents of any race comprised 3.3% of the population.

18.8% of residents lived in urban areas, while 81.2% lived in rural areas.

There were 8,923 households in the county, of which 26.6% had children under the age of 18 living in them. Of all households, 54.4% were married-couple households, 18.3% were households with a male householder and no spouse or partner present, and 20.2% were households with a female householder and no spouse or partner present. About 27.6% of all households were made up of individuals and 13.8% had someone living alone who was 65 years of age or older.

There were 10,158 housing units, of which 12.2% were vacant. Among occupied housing units, 81.2% were owner-occupied and 18.8% were renter-occupied. The homeowner vacancy rate was 1.0% and the rental vacancy rate was 7.9%.

=== 2000 census ===
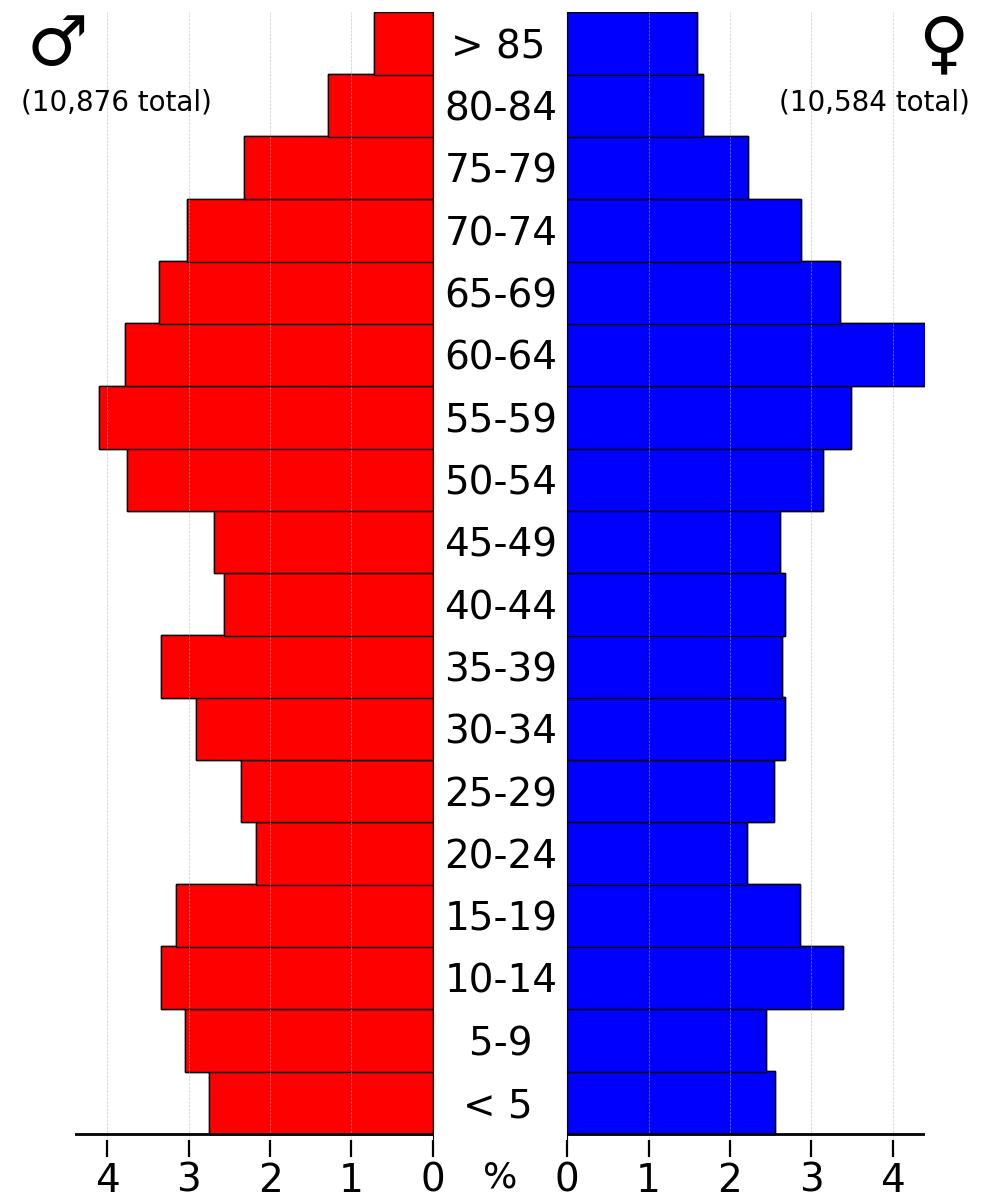
2022 US Census population pyramid for Wabasha County, from ACS 5-year estimates

As of the census of 2000, there were 21,610 people, 8,277 households, and 5,876 families in the county. The population density was 41.3 per square mile (15.9/km^{2}). There were 9,066 housing units at an average density of 17.3 per square mile (6.7/km^{2}). The racial makeup of the county was 97.97% White, 0.25% Black or African American, 0.27% Native American, 0.43% Asian, 0.62% from other races, and 0.45% from two or more races. 1.68% of the population were Hispanic or Latino of any race. 53.3% were of German, 11.1% Norwegian, 7.3% Irish and 5.0% American ancestry.

There were 8,277 households, out of which 33.80% had children under the age of 18 living with them, 60.80% were married couples living together, 6.50% had a female householder with no husband present, and 29.00% were non-families. 24.30% of all households were made up of individuals, and 10.80% had someone living alone who was 65 years of age or older. The average household size was 2.57 and the average family size was 3.07.

The county population contained 27.10% under the age of 18, 7.20% from 18 to 24, 27.00% from 25 to 44, 23.80% from 45 to 64, and 15.00% who were 65 years of age or older. The median age was 38 years. For every 100 females, there were 100.00 males. For every 100 females age 18 and over, there were 97.90 males.

The median income for a household in the county was $42,117, and the median income for a family was $50,480. Males had a median income of $33,053 versus $24,316 for females. The per capita income for the county was $19,664. About 4.10% of families and 6.00% of the population were below the poverty line, including 6.00% of those under age 18 and 9.30% of those age 65 or over.

== Communities ==
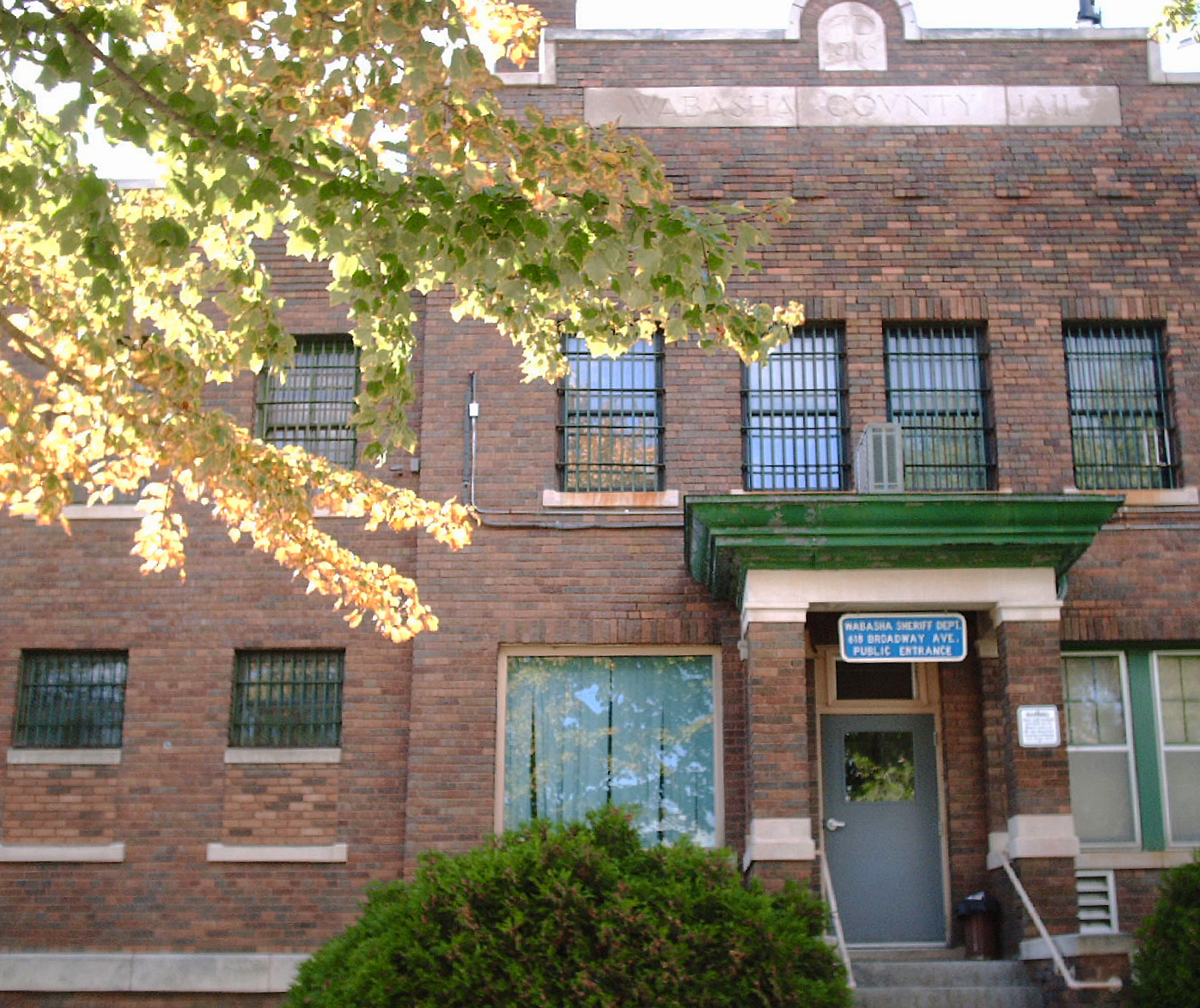
Wabasha County Jail, built 1916.

=== Cities ===
- Bellechester (partly in Goodhue County)
- Elgin
- Hammond
- Kellogg
- Lake City (partly in Goodhue County)
- Mazeppa
- Millville
- Minneiska (partly in Winona County)
- Plainview
- Wabasha (county seat)
- Zumbro Falls

=== Unincorporated communities ===
- Bear Valley
- Camp Lacupolis
- Conception
- Dumfries
- Jarrett
- Maple Springs
- Oak Center
- Reads Landing
- South Troy
- Theilman
- Weaver
- West Albany
- West Newton

=== Townships ===
- Chester
- Elgin
- Gillford
- Glasgow
- Greenfield
- Highland
- Hyde Park
- Lake
- Mazeppa
- Minneiska
- Mount Pleasant
- Oakwood
- Pepin
- Plainview
- Watopa
- West Albany
- Zumbro

== Politics ==
Wabasha County voters have traditionally voted Republican. In only two national elections since 1964 has the county selected the Democratic Party candidate (as of 2024).

United States presidential election results for Wabasha County, Minnesota
Year	Republican		Democratic		Third party(ies)	
Year	No.	%	No.	%	No.	%
1892	1,580	43.16%	1,774	48.46%	307	8.39%
1896	2,530	58.86%	1,630	37.92%	138	3.21%
1900	2,114	57.68%	1,406	38.36%	145	3.96%
1904	2,315	66.14%	1,083	30.94%	102	2.91%
1908	2,150	58.36%	1,416	38.44%	118	3.20%
1912	797	23.32%	1,422	41.62%	1,198	35.06%
1916	1,787	53.11%	1,449	43.06%	129	3.83%
1920	4,907	77.11%	1,275	20.03%	182	2.86%
1924	2,834	44.93%	644	10.21%	2,829	44.85%
1928	3,944	55.84%	3,087	43.71%	32	0.45%
1932	2,319	33.23%	4,540	65.06%	119	1.71%
1936	2,663	34.60%	4,122	53.55%	912	11.85%
1940	5,656	67.95%	2,655	31.90%	13	0.16%
1944	4,213	62.62%	2,482	36.89%	33	0.49%
1948	3,297	46.42%	3,730	52.52%	75	1.06%
1952	5,461	69.63%	2,356	30.04%	26	0.33%
1956	4,728	66.89%	2,301	32.56%	39	0.55%
1960	4,566	55.70%	3,628	44.26%	3	0.04%
1964	3,133	41.75%	4,367	58.20%	4	0.05%
1968	4,081	51.75%	3,452	43.77%	353	4.48%
1972	5,158	61.31%	3,017	35.86%	238	2.83%
1976	4,484	49.55%	4,286	47.36%	279	3.08%
1980	4,986	52.75%	3,712	39.27%	755	7.99%
1984	5,299	57.31%	3,872	41.87%	76	0.82%
1988	4,681	50.80%	4,442	48.20%	92	1.00%
1992	3,397	33.25%	3,736	36.57%	3,084	30.18%
1996	3,452	36.06%	4,523	47.25%	1,598	16.69%
2000	5,245	49.81%	4,522	42.94%	764	7.25%
2004	6,120	51.71%	5,548	46.88%	167	1.41%
2008	5,935	49.90%	5,646	47.47%	312	2.62%
2012	6,049	51.42%	5,415	46.03%	299	2.54%
2016	6,989	59.07%	3,866	32.67%	977	8.26%
2020	8,153	62.13%	4,696	35.78%	274	2.09%
2024	8,523	63.09%	4,721	34.95%	265	1.96%

== See also ==
- National Register of Historic Places listings in Wabasha County, Minnesota
- Upper Mississippi River National Wildlife and Fish Refuge
- Wabasha Public Library
