= Highland Township, Wabasha County, Minnesota =

Highland Township, Minnesota
- Township
- Location within the state of Minnesota Highland Township, Minnesota (the United States)
- Coordinates: 44°14′24″N 92°7′24″W
- Country: United States
- State: Minnesota
- County: Wabasha

Area
  - Total: 35.8 sq mi (92.7 km^{2})
  - Land: 35.8 sq mi (92.7 km^{2})
  - Water: 0 sq mi (0.0 km^{2})
- Elevation: 1,161 ft (354 m)

Population (2000)
  - Total: 471
  - Density: 13/sq mi (5.1/km^{2})
- Time zone: UTC-6 (Central (CST))
  - Summer (DST): UTC-5 (CDT)
- FIPS code: 27-28952
- GNIS feature ID: 0664469

Highland Township is a township in Wabasha County, Minnesota, United States. The population was 471 at the 2000 census.

== History ==
Highland Township was originally called Smithfield Township, and under the latter name was organized in 1858. The present name is descriptive of the land's lofty elevation.

== Geography ==
According to the United States Census Bureau, the township has a total area of 35.8 square miles (93 km^{2}); 35.8 square miles (93 km^{2}) of it is land and 0.03% is water.

== Demographics ==
As of the census of 2000, there were 471 people, 147 households, and 120 families residing in the township. The population density was 13.2 inhabitants per square mile (5.1/km^{2}). There were 155 housing units at an average density of 4.3 per square mile (1.7/km^{2}). The racial makeup of the township was 99.79% White, and 0.21% Asian.

There were 147 households, out of which 46.3% had children under the age of 18 living with them, 71.4% were married couples living together, 4.1% had a female householder with no husband present, and 17.7% were non-families. 12.9% of all households were made up of individuals, and 6.1% had someone living alone who was 65 years of age or older. The average household size was 3.20 and the average family size was 3.58.

In the township the population was spread out, with 32.3% under the age of 18, 11.0% from 18 to 24, 25.3% from 25 to 44, 21.2% from 45 to 64, and 10.2% who were 65 years of age or older. The median age was 34 years. For every 100 females, there were 111.2 males. For every 100 females age 18 and over, there were 121.5 males.

The median income for a household in the township was $49,375, and the median income for a family was $55,139. Males had a median income of $32,232 versus $22,000 for females. The per capita income for the township was $18,747. About 8.9% of families and 8.1% of the population were below the poverty line, including 6.4% of those under age 18 and 24.4% of those age 65 or over.
