= Chester Township =

Chester Township may refer to:

== Arkansas ==
- Chester Township, Arkansas County, Arkansas, in Arkansas County, Arkansas
- Chester Township, Crawford County, Arkansas, in Crawford County, Arkansas
- Chester Township, Dallas County, Arkansas, in Dallas County, Arkansas

== Illinois ==
- Chester Township, Logan County, Illinois

== Indiana ==
- Chester Township, Wabash County, Indiana
- Chester Township, Wells County, Indiana

== Iowa ==
- Chester Township, Howard County, Iowa
- Chester Township, Poweshiek County, Iowa

== Michigan ==
- Chester Township, Eaton County, Michigan
- Chester Township, Otsego County, Michigan
- Chester Township, Ottawa County, Michigan

== Minnesota ==
- Chester Township, Polk County, Minnesota
- Chester Township, Wabasha County, Minnesota

== Nebraska ==
- Chester Township, Saunders County, Nebraska

== New Jersey ==
- Chester Township, New Jersey

== North Dakota ==
- Chester Township, Grand Forks County, North Dakota, in Grand Forks County, North Dakota

== Ohio ==
- Chester Township, Clinton County, Ohio
- Chester Township, Geauga County, Ohio
- Chester Township, Meigs County, Ohio
- Chester Township, Morrow County, Ohio
- Chester Township, Wayne County, Ohio

== Pennsylvania ==
- Chester Township, Delaware County, Pennsylvania

== South Dakota ==
- Chester Township, Douglas County, South Dakota, in Douglas County, South Dakota
- Chester Township, Lake County, South Dakota, in Lake County, South Dakota
