= Lake Township, Hall County, Nebraska =

Township in Hall County, Nebraska

Coordinates: 41.006°N 98.332°W

Lake Township is a township in Hall County, Nebraska, in the United States.

== History ==
It was organized in 1881.
