= Wabasha Public Library =

American public library in Wabasha, Minnesota

- 44.38347°N 92.03354°W
- Location: 168 Alleghany Ave. Wabasha, MN 55981, USA
- Branch of: SELCO

Other information
- Director: Bev Hall
- Website: http://www.wabasha.lib.mn.us/

The Wabasha Public Library is a library in Wabasha, Minnesota. It is a member of Southeastern Libraries Cooperating (SELCO), the south east Minnesota library region. The library serves a community of about 4,700 residents.

== History ==
The Wabasha Public Library began in 1868 as a subscription library and leisure club with forty two members. The library and club was open to both men and women, but it was run exclusively by men. By 1871, interest in the club had waned and it was on the brink of closing, until the newly formed Ladies Library Association decided to take over the endeavor. The ladies began their tenure in debt and with only a 150 books in their library, but in time the association became quite successful. The library association originally charged a membership fee of a dollar for women and two dollars for men, along with additional monthly dues of twenty five cents. By 1900, the library association had erased their debt, eliminated membership fees, and reduced the monthly price of dues. The library had also grown to hold over 4,000 volumes. The Ladies Library Association ran the library for a total of forty one years.

The transition from a subscription library to a public library was a gradual one. In 1909, the library was transferred to the second floor of the City Hall building, but the Ladies Association still provided funding for the library. In March 1911, the Ladies Library Association agreed to give control of the library over to the city of Wabasha. On April 22, 1911, the library was reopened as a public library. Hours of operation expanded from one day and one evening a week to three evenings a week and Saturday afternoon. Membership grew in the first year from a 100 to 459 patrons.

In 1968, a 100 years after the library first began, it moved to its current location on the corner of Alleghany Avenue and Second Street. The library expanded in 2017 with a 1,150 sq ft. addition.

In 1972, the Wabasha Public Library became a part of Southeastern Libraries Cooperating (SELCO), which is a regional public library system for Southeastern Minnesota.

== Programs and Services ==
The Wabasha Public library holds over 27,000 books, along with magazine and newspaper collections. They also offer digital and electronic materials such eBooks, audio books, CDs, and DVDs. In addition, they also have a range of digital services and databases for patrons, including Ancestry’s genealogy database. The library has digital equipment including projectors, screens, and cameras available to borrow. There are computers available onsite for patron use, and free Wi-Fi access. The library has a teen area and a children’s room that was recently renovated in 2017.

The library often plays host to local artists and authors, and hold community outreach events. The Young at Heart (Y.A.H.) book club meets once a month on the third Wednesday of every month.

The Friends of Wabasha Public Library is a non-profit group of volunteers that partners with the library, supports their services, and assists with fundraising activities.
