= Lake Township, Kosciusko County, Indiana =

Lake Township
- Township
- Coordinates: 41°04′17″N 85°50′53″W
- Country: United States
- State: Indiana
- County: Kosciusko

Government
  - Type: Indiana township

Area
  - Total: 23.31 sq mi (60.4 km^{2})
  - Land: 22.87 sq mi (59.2 km^{2})
  - Water: 0.44 sq mi (1.1 km^{2})
- Elevation: 879 ft (268 m)

Population (2020)
  - Total: 1,549
  - Density: 69.4/sq mi (26.8/km^{2})
- Time zone: UTC-5 (Eastern (EST))
  - Summer (DST): UTC-4 (EDT)
- FIPS code: 18-40950
- GNIS feature ID: 453536

Lake Township is one of seventeen townships in Kosciusko County, Indiana, United States. As of the 2020 census, its population was 1,549 (down from 1,588 at 2010) and it contained 743 housing units.

Lake Township was organized in 1870.

== Geography ==
According to the 2010 census, the township has a total area of 23.31 square miles (60.4 km^{2}), of which 22.87 square miles (59.2 km^{2}) (or 98.11%) is land and 0.44 square miles (1.1 km^{2}) (or 1.89%) is water.

=== Cities and towns ===
- Silver Lake
