= Chester Township, Polk County, Minnesota =

Chester Township, Minnesota
- Township
- Location of Chester Township, within Polk County, Minnesota
- Coordinates: 47°48′52″N 95°46′17″W
- Country: United States
- State: Minnesota
- County: Polk

Area
  - Total: 35.9 sq mi (93.1 km^{2})
  - Land: 35.9 sq mi (93.0 km^{2})
  - Water: 0.039 sq mi (0.1 km^{2})
- Elevation: 1,155 ft (352 m)

Population (2020)
  - Total: 96
  - Density: 2.7/sq mi (1.0/km^{2})
- Time zone: UTC-6 (Central (CST))
  - Summer (DST): UTC-5 (CDT)
- FIPS code: 27-11224
- GNIS feature ID: 0663792

Chester Township is a township in Polk County, Minnesota, United States. The population was 96 at the 2020 census. It is part of the Grand Forks-ND-MN Metropolitan Statistical Area.

== Geography ==
The township is located near geocoordinates 47.808N, 95.775W. According to the United States Census Bureau, the township has a total area of 35.9 square miles (93 km^{2}), of which 35.9 square miles (93 km^{2}) is land and 0.04 square miles (0.10 km^{2}) (0.08%) is water.

== Demographics ==
As of the census of 2000, there were 79 people, 28 households, and 22 families residing in the township. The population density was 2.2 inhabitants per square mile (0.85/km^{2}). There were 37 housing units at an average density of 1.0 per square mile (0.39/km^{2}). The racial makeup of the township was 100.00% White. Hispanic or Latino of any race were 2.53% of the population.

There were 28 households, out of which 32.1% had children under the age of 18 living with them, 71.4% were married couples living together, 7.1% had a female householder with no husband present, and 21.4% were non-families. 17.9% of all households were made up of individuals, and 7.1% had someone living alone who was 65 years of age or older. The average household size was 2.82 and the average family size was 3.23.

In the township the population was 29.1% under the age of 18, 7.6% from 18 to 24, 29.1% from 25 to 44, 17.7% from 45 to 64, and 16.5% who were 65 years of age or older. The median age was 38 years. For every 100 females, there were 119.4 males. For every 100 females age 18 and over, there were 100.0 males.

The median income for a household in the township was $53,125, and the median income for a family was $53,125. Males had a median income of $27,500 versus $27,083 for females. The per capita income for the township was $16,830. There were 4.0% of families and 14.1% of the population living below the poverty line, including 31.0% of under eighteens and 9.1% of those over 64.
