= Lake Township, Wabasha County, Minnesota =

Lake Township, Minnesota
- Township
- Location within the state of Minnesota Lake Township, Minnesota (the United States)
- Coordinates: 44°24′31″N 92°15′6″W
- Country: United States
- State: Minnesota
- County: Wabasha

Area
  - Total: 29.8 sq mi (77.3 km^{2})
  - Land: 25.1 sq mi (64.9 km^{2})
  - Water: 4.8 sq mi (12.4 km^{2})
- Elevation: 781 ft (238 m)

Population (2000)
  - Total: 412
  - Density: 17/sq mi (6.4/km^{2})
- Time zone: UTC-6 (Central (CST))
  - Summer (DST): UTC-5 (CDT)
- FIPS code: 27-34028
- GNIS feature ID: 0664659

Lake Township is a township in Wabasha County, Minnesota, United States. The population was 412 at the 2000 census.

Lake Township was originally called Lake City Township when it was organized in 1858, but the name was shortened to its present form after 1872.

== Geography ==
According to the United States Census Bureau, the township has a total area of 29.8 square miles (77 km^{2}); 25.0 square miles (65 km^{2}) of it is land and 4.8 square miles (12 km^{2}) of it (16.02%) is water.

== Demographics ==
As of the census of 2000, there were 412 people, 149 households, and 116 families residing in the township. The population density was 16.4 inhabitants per square mile (6.3/km^{2}). There were 161 housing units at an average density of 6.4 per square mile (2.5/km^{2}). The racial makeup of the township was 99.27% White, 0.24% Asian, and 0.49% from two or more races. Hispanic or Latino of any race were 1.46% of the population.

There were 149 households, out of which 36.9% had children under the age of 18 living with them, 69.8% were married couples living together, 5.4% had a female householder with no husband present, and 21.5% were non-families. 15.4% of all households were made up of individuals, and 5.4% had someone living alone who was 65 years of age or older. The average household size was 2.77 and the average family size was 3.11.

In the township the population was spread out, with 29.4% under the age of 18, 4.4% from 18 to 24, 26.7% from 25 to 44, 27.7% from 45 to 64, and 11.9% who were 65 years of age or older. The median age was 39 years. For every 100 females, there were 97.1 males. For every 100 females age 18 and over, there were 98.0 males.

The median income for a household in the township was $54,688, and the median income for a family was $54,375. Males had a median income of $38,056 versus $25,268 for females. The per capita income for the township was $21,327. About 4.5% of families and 4.2% of the population were below the poverty line, including 5.7% of those under age 18 and 18.8% of those age 65 or over.
