= West Albany Township, Wabasha County, Minnesota =

West Albany Township, Minnesota
- Township
- Location within the state of Minnesota West Albany Township, Minnesota (the United States)
- Coordinates: 44°17′45″N 92°14′21″W
- Country: United States
- State: Minnesota
- County: Wabasha

Area
  - Total: 35.8 sq mi (92.6 km^{2})
  - Land: 35.6 sq mi (92.1 km^{2})
  - Water: 0.15 sq mi (0.4 km^{2})
- Elevation: 920 ft (280 m)

Population (2000)
  - Total: 439
  - Density: 12/sq mi (4.8/km^{2})
- Time zone: UTC-6 (Central (CST))
  - Summer (DST): UTC-5 (CDT)
- FIPS code: 27-69178
- GNIS feature ID: 0665954

West Albany Township is a township in Wabasha County, Minnesota, United States. The population was 439 at the 2000 census.

West Albany Township was organized in 1858, and named after its largest settlement, West Albany, Minnesota.

== Geography ==
According to the United States Census Bureau, the township has a total area of 35.7 square miles (92.5 km^{2}); 35.6 square miles (92.1 km^{2}) of it is land and 0.2 square miles (0.4 km^{2}) of it (0.45%) is water.

== Demographics ==
As of the census of 2000, there were 439 people, 147 households, and 122 families residing in the township. The population density was 12.3 people per square mile (4.8/km^{2}). There were 153 housing units at an average density of 4.3/sq mi (1.7/km^{2}). The racial makeup of the township was 97.04% White, 0.91% Asian, 1.82% from other races, and 0.23% from two or more races. Hispanic or Latino of any race were 2.05% of the population.

There were 147 households, out of which 42.9% had children under the age of 18 living with them, 68.7% were married couples living together, 6.1% had a female householder with no husband present, and 17.0% were non-families. 11.6% of all households were made up of individuals, and 2.7% had someone living alone who was 65 years of age or older. The average household size was 2.99 and the average family size was 3.29.

In the township the population was spread out, with 31.2% under the age of 18, 8.7% from 18 to 24, 27.6% from 25 to 44, 24.8% from 45 to 64, and 7.7% who were 65 years of age or older. The median age was 33 years. For every 100 females, there were 115.2 males. For every 100 females age 18 and over, there were 117.3 males.

The median income for a household in the township was $48,125, and the median income for a family was $53,000. Males had a median income of $34,688 versus $21,146 for females. The per capita income for the township was $17,768. About 6.1% of families and 5.8% of the population were below the poverty line, including 4.2% of those under age 18 and 23.1% of those age 65 or over.
