= Glasgow Township, Wabasha County, Minnesota =

Glasgow Township, Minnesota
- Township
- Location within the state of Minnesota Glasgow Township, Minnesota (the United States)
- Coordinates: 44°18′29″N 92°7′43″W
- Country: United States
- State: Minnesota
- County: Wabasha

Area
  - Total: 35.6 sq mi (92.3 km^{2})
  - Land: 35.2 sq mi (91.2 km^{2})
  - Water: 0.46 sq mi (1.2 km^{2})
- Elevation: 709 ft (216 m)

Population (2000)
  - Total: 298
  - Density: 8.5/sq mi (3.3/km^{2})
- Time zone: UTC-6 (Central (CST))
  - Summer (DST): UTC-5 (CDT)
- FIPS code: 27-23894
- GNIS feature ID: 0664274

Glasgow Township is a township in Wabasha County, Minnesota, United States. The population was 298 at the 2000 census.

Glasgow Township was organized in 1858, and named after Glasgow, in Scotland, the native country of a share of the first settlers.

== Geography ==
According to the United States Census Bureau, the township has a total area of 35.7 square miles (92 km^{2}); 35.2 square miles (91 km^{2}) of it is land and 0.5 square miles (1.3 km^{2}) of it (1.29%) is water.

== Demographics ==
As of the census of 2000, there were 298 people, 103 households, and 79 families residing in the township. The population density was 8.5 inhabitants per square mile (3.3/km^{2}). There were 113 housing units at an average density of 3.2 per square mile (1.2/km^{2}). The racial makeup of the township was 99.66% White and 0.34% Asian.

There were 103 households, out of which 40.8% had children under the age of 18 living with them, 73.8% were married couples living together, and 23.3% were non-families. 21.4% of all households were made up of individuals, and 5.8% had someone living alone who was 65 years of age or older. The average household size was 2.89 and the average family size was 3.43.

In the township the population was spread out, with 34.9% under the age of 18, 3.7% from 18 to 24, 27.5% from 25 to 44, 24.2% from 45 to 64, and 9.7% who were 65 years of age or older. The median age was 36 years. For every 100 females, there were 105.5 males. For every 100 females age 18 and over, there were 113.2 males.

The median income for a household in the township was $40,625, and the median income for a family was $53,750. Males had a median income of $31,563 versus $27,917 for females. The per capita income for the township was $16,322. None of the families and 1.6% of the population were living below the poverty line.
