= Chester Township, Wabasha County, Minnesota =

Chester Township, Minnesota
- Township
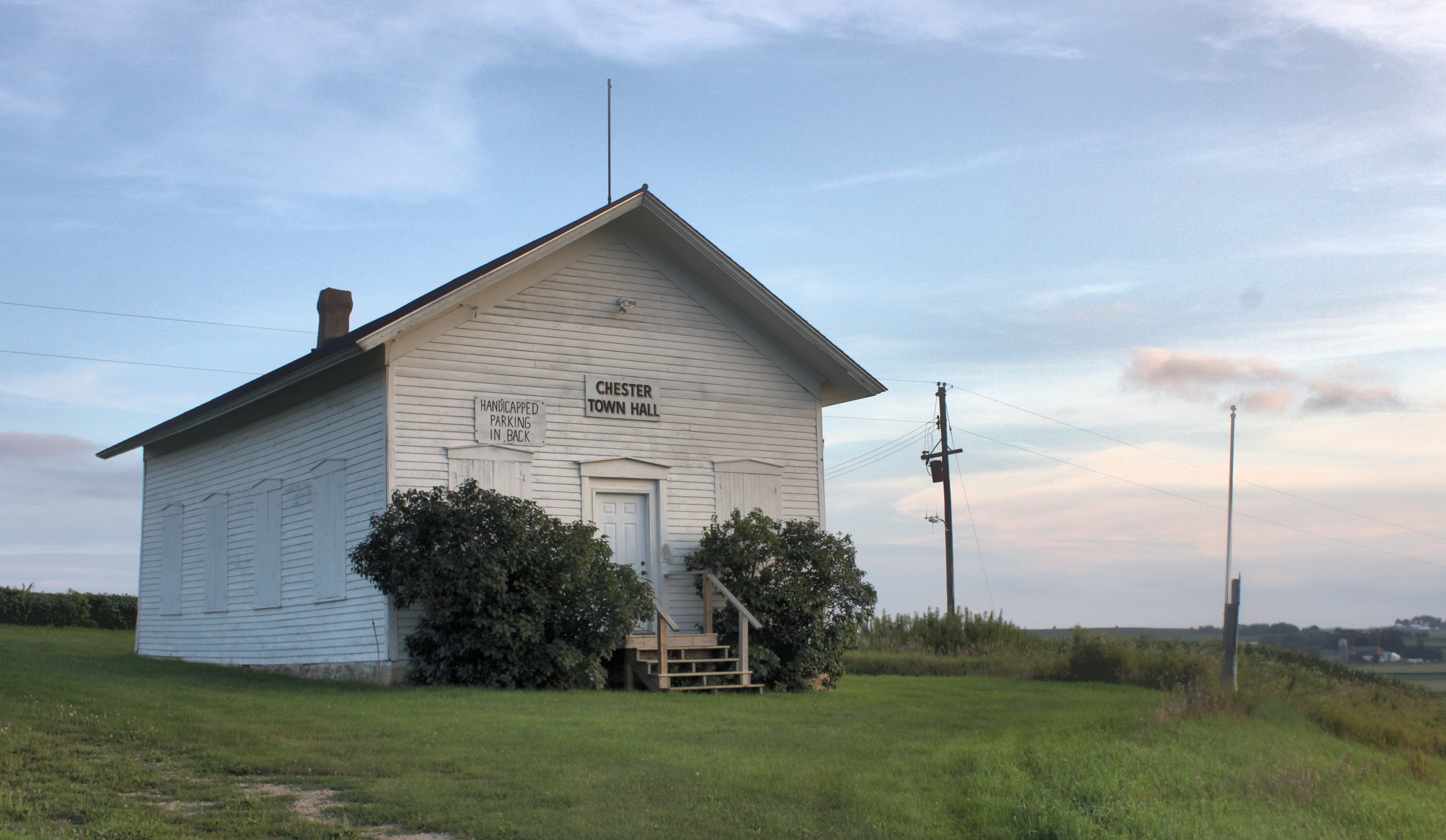
- Chester Town Hall

- Location within the state of Minnesota Chester Township, Minnesota (the United States)
- Coordinates: 44°19′1″N 92°28′41″W
- Country: United States
- State: Minnesota
- County: Wabasha

Area
  - Total: 35.5 sq mi (91.9 km^{2})
  - Land: 35.4 sq mi (91.8 km^{2})
  - Water: 0.039 sq mi (0.1 km^{2})
- Elevation: 1,056 ft (322 m)

Population (2000)
  - Total: 470
  - Density: 13/sq mi (5.1/km^{2})
- Time zone: UTC-6 (Central (CST))
  - Summer (DST): UTC-5 (CDT)
- FIPS code: 27-11242
- GNIS feature ID: 0663793

Chester Township is a township in Wabasha County, Minnesota, United States. The population was 470 at the 2000 census.

Chester Township was organized in 1858.

== Geography ==
According to the United States Census Bureau, the township has a total area of 35.5 square miles (92 km^{2}); 35.4 square miles (92 km^{2}) of it is land and 0.04 square miles (0.10 km^{2}) of it (0.08%) is water. The township contains one property listed on the National Register of Historic Places: the 1874 Bear Valley Grange Hall, which now serves as the town hall.

== Demographics ==
As of the census of 2000, there were 470 people, 162 households, and 125 families residing in the township. The population density was 13.3 inhabitants per square mile (5.1/km^{2}). There were 165 housing units at an average density of 4.7 per square mile (1.8/km^{2}). The racial makeup of the township was 99.57% White and 0.43% Asian. Hispanic or Latino of any race were 0.43% of the population.

There were 162 households, out of which 38.9% had children under the age of 18 living with them, 64.8% were married couples living together, 4.3% had a female householder with no husband present, and 22.8% were non-families. 18.5% of all households were made up of individuals, and 9.9% had someone living alone who was 65 years of age or older. The average household size was 2.90 and the average family size was 3.37.

In the township the population was spread out, with 30.0% under the age of 18, 9.4% from 18 to 24, 28.3% from 25 to 44, 22.6% from 45 to 64, and 9.8% who were 65 years of age or older. The median age was 37 years. For every 100 females, there were 110.8 males. For every 100 females age 18 and over, there were 110.9 males.

The median income for a household in the township was $48,750, and the median income for a family was $52,308. Males had a median income of $31,406 versus $21,731 for females. The per capita income for the township was $20,701. About 1.7% of families and 3.8% of the population were below the poverty line, including 4.7% of those under age 18 and 5.4% of those age 65 or over.
