= Kellogg, Minnesota =

City in Minnesota, United States

Kellogg
- City
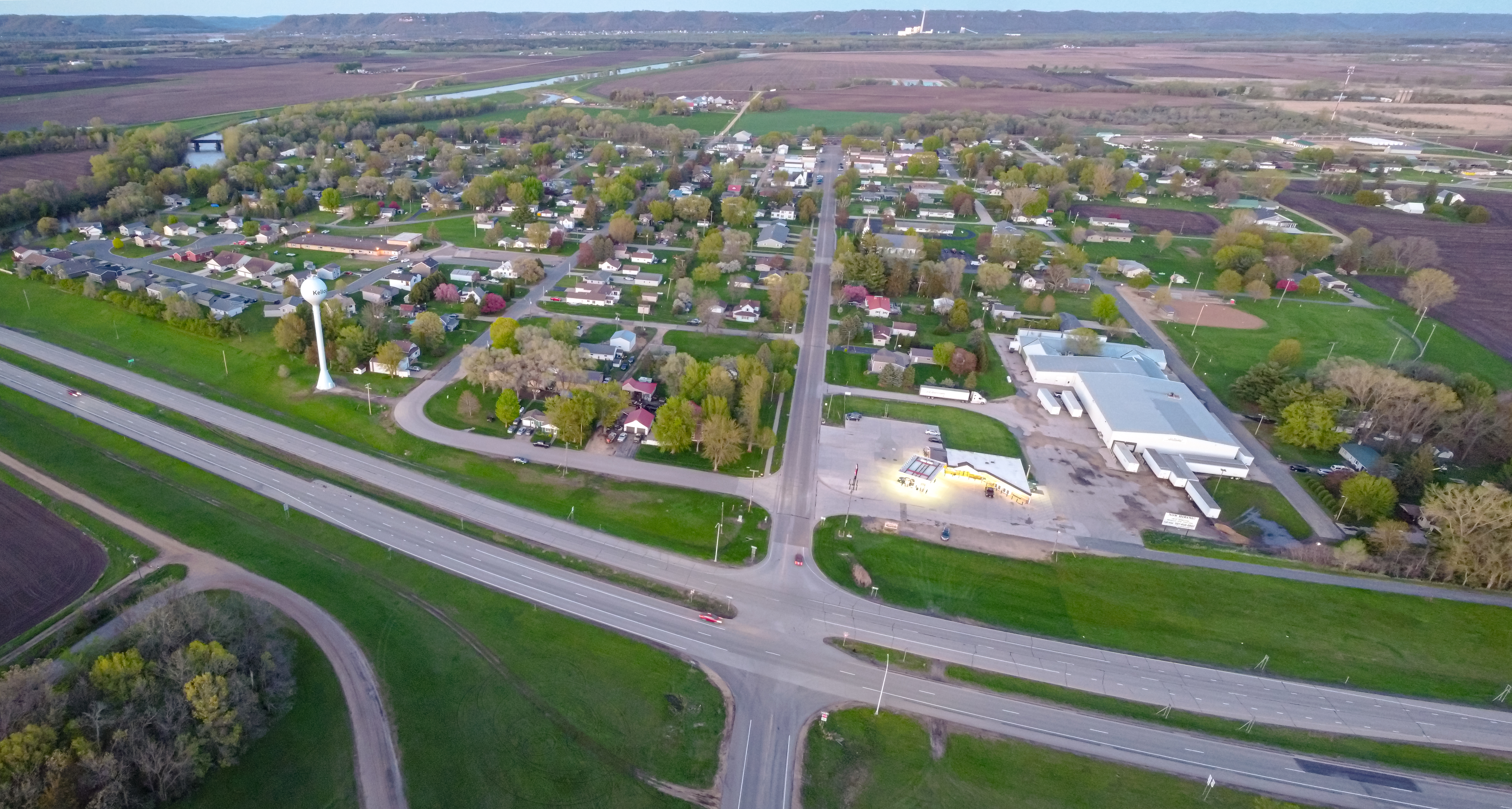
- US-61 runs by

- Location of Kellogg, Minnesota
- Coordinates: 44°18′25″N 91°59′56″W
- Country: United States
- State: Minnesota
- County: Wabasha

Area
  - Total: 0.32 sq mi (0.82 km^{2})
  - Land: 0.31 sq mi (0.80 km^{2})
  - Water: 0.0039 sq mi (0.01 km^{2})
- Elevation: 702 ft (214 m)

Population (2020)
  - Total: 415
  - Density: 1,340.7/sq mi (517.66/km^{2})
- Time zone: UTC-6 (Central (CST))
  - Summer (DST): UTC-5 (CDT)
- ZIP code: 55945
- Area code: 507
- FIPS code: 27-32642
- GNIS feature ID: 0646073
- Website: www.cityofkellogg.org

Kellogg is a city in Wabasha County, Minnesota, along the Zumbro River. As of the 2020 census, Kellogg had a population of 415.

== History ==
Kellogg was laid out in 1870, and named for a railroad sign maker A post office has been in operation at Kellogg since 1872. Kellogg was incorporated in 1877.

== Geography ==
According to the United States Census Bureau, the city has a total area of 0.31 square miles (0.80 km^{2}); 0.30 square miles (0.78 km^{2}) is land and 0.01 square miles (0.03 km^{2}) is water.

U.S. Route 61 and Minnesota State Highway 42 are two of the main routes in the community.

== Demographics ==
Historical population
Census	Pop.	Note	%±
1880	221		—
1900	228		—
1910	372		63.2%
1920	370		−0.5%
1930	409		10.5%
1940	403		−1.5%
1950	409		1.5%
1960	446		9.0%
1970	403		−9.6%
1980	440		9.2%
1990	423		−3.9%
2000	439		3.8%
2010	456		3.9%
2020	415		−9.0%
U.S. Decennial Census

As of 2000 the median income for a household in the city was $37,885, and the median income for a family was $40,515. Males had a median income of $28,125 versus $22,885 for females. The per capita income for the city was $16,216. About 6.5% of families and 14.0% of the population were below the poverty line, including 18.8% of those under age 18 and 9.5% of those age 65 or over.

=== 2010 census ===
As of the census of 2010, there were 456 people, 200 households, and 129 families residing in the city. The population density was 1,520.0 inhabitants per square mile (586.9/km^{2}). There were 208 housing units at an average density of 693.3 per square mile (267.7/km^{2}). The racial makeup of the city was 99.1% White, 0.7% Asian, and 0.2% from two or more races. Hispanic or Latino of any race were 0.2% of the population.

There were 200 households, of which 28.5% had children under the age of 18 living with them, 50.5% were married couples living together, 8.5% had a female householder with no husband present, 5.5% had a male householder with no wife present, and 35.5% were non-families. 27.0% of all households were made up of individuals, and 14% had someone living alone who was 65 years of age or older. The average household size was 2.28 and the average family size was 2.78.

The median age in the city was 41.5 years. 21.7% of residents were under the age of 18; 5.6% were between the ages of 18 and 24; 28.7% were from 25 to 44; 26.6% were from 45 to 64; and 17.5% were 65 years of age or older. The gender makeup of the city was 49.6% male and 50.4% female.

== Economy ==
The Mississippi River Lock and Dam No. 4 is located near Kellogg.

== Transportation ==
Amtrak’s Empire Builder, which operates between Seattle/Portland and Chicago, passes through the town on BNSF tracks, but makes no stop. The nearest station is located in Winona, 27 miles (43 km) to the southeast.

== Residents ==
- Katherine Hancock Goode, state legislator in Illinois
