= Mazeppa, Minnesota =

City in Minnesota, United States

Mazeppa
- City
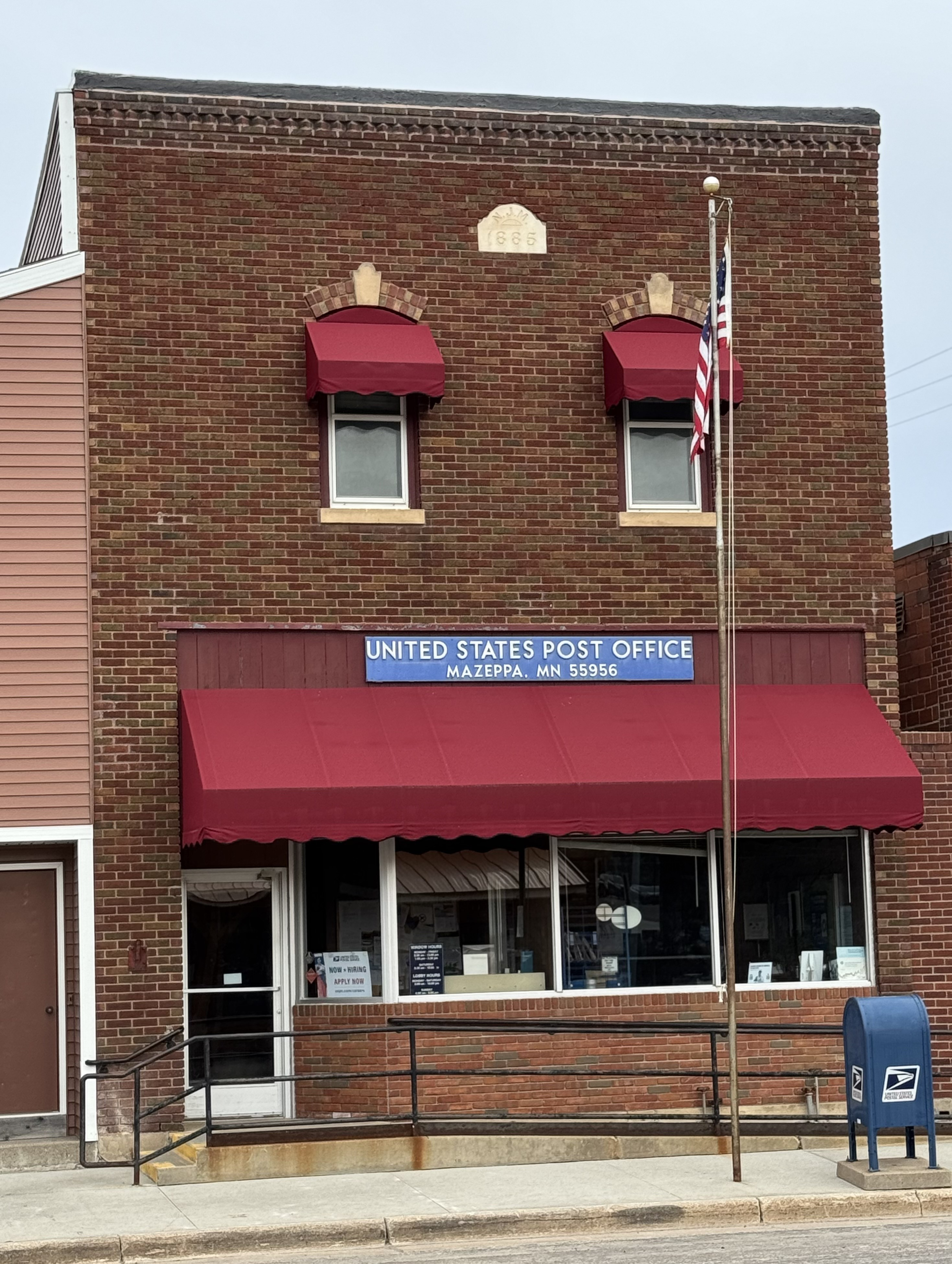
- Mazeppa Post Office

- Location of Mazeppa, Minnesota
- Coordinates: 44°16′21″N 92°32′39″W
- Country: United States
- State: Minnesota
- County: Wabasha
- Settled: 1854
- Platted: 1855
- Incorporated as a village: 1870
- Founder: Ira O. Seeley
- Named for: Ivan Mazepa

Area
  - Total: 1.08 sq mi (2.80 km^{2})
  - Land: 1.08 sq mi (2.80 km^{2})
  - Water: 0 sq mi (0.00 km^{2})
- Elevation: 955 ft (291 m)

Population (2020)
  - Total: 874
  - Estimate (2022): 889
  - Density: 807.1/sq mi (311.63/km^{2})
- Time zone: UTC-6 (Central (CST))
  - Summer (DST): UTC-5 (CDT)
- ZIP code: 55956
- Area code: 507
- FIPS code: 27-41282
- GNIS feature ID: 0647648
- Website: https://mazeppamn.us/

Mazeppa (/mɑːˈzɛpə/ mah-ZEP-ə) is a city in Wabasha County, Minnesota, United States, along the North Fork of the Zumbro River. The population was 874 at the 2020 census.

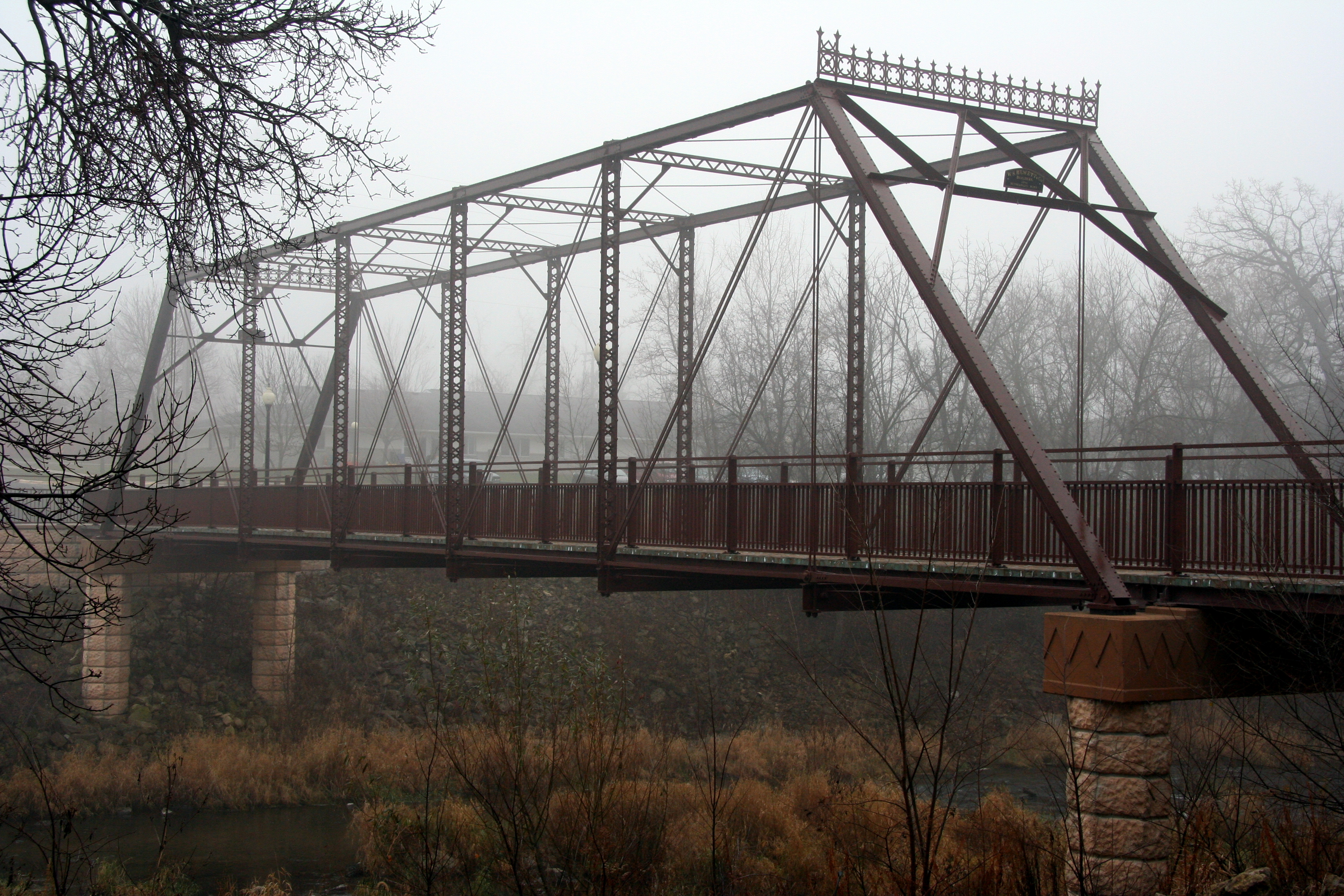
The Walnut Street Walking Bridge crosses the Zumbro River in Mazeppa and is on the National Register of Historic Places.

== History ==
Mazeppa was first settled by Ira O. Seeley in the autumn of 1854.^{:727} Seeley squatted on a land claim in modern-day Mazeppa where he constructed a log cabin.^{:}^{1275}^{:104} Mazeppa was platted in 1855, and named in honor of Hetman Ivan Mazepa via a poem by Lord Byron. The first census was taken in 1860, it showed 534 residents. The town was incorporated in 1877. Mazeppa in its early years was a flour milling center and boasted 7 trains a day at its peak. The line was nicknamed the "Bug Line" due to the crooked nature of the line east of town. The mill during its best years produced 600 barrels of flour a day and had 80 employees. The mill was powered by a turbine from water held back by 26 foot tall wooden dam on the Zumbro River and formed the "Mill Pond" as seen in historical pictures. The mill had its ups and downs until it burned down on Feb 2, 1891, foul play was suspected. The last train left Mazeppa in 1952. Despite valiant efforts at growth and industry, Mazeppa has since moved into the 21st Century as a quiet, well kept farm & bedroom community.

The Mazeppa Public School was built in 1858 and further expanded on many times including a new High School completed in 1958. A fire on December 26, 1975, destroyed the historic elementary school. The newer adjoining high school and 1940s gymnasium were saved from the blaze by the heroic efforts of Mazeppa residents Keith Ramthun & Joseph Liffrig who managed to close the fire doors leading to the high school and gymnasium before the fire department arrived. The Mazeppa Public School system merged with the Zumbrota Public School system in fall of 1987 to create the Zumbrota-Mazeppa Public Schools represented by the mascot the "Cougars".

The city contains one property listed on the National Register of Historic Places: the 1904 Walnut Street Bridge.

== Geography ==
According to the United States Census Bureau, the city has a total area of 1.09 square miles (2.82 km^{2}), all of it land.

Minnesota State Highway 60 serves as a main route in the community.

== Demographics ==
Historical population
Census	Pop.	Note	%±
1880	460		—
1900	556		—
1910	471		−15.3%
1920	481		2.1%
1930	450		−6.4%
1940	545		21.1%
1950	523		−4.0%
1960	444		−15.1%
1970	498		12.2%
1980	680		36.5%
1990	722		6.2%
2000	778		7.8%
2010	842		8.2%
2020	874		3.8%
2022 (est.)	889		1.7%
U.S. Decennial Census; 2020 Census

=== 2010 census ===
As of the census of 2010, there were 842 people, 337 households, and 234 families living in the city. The population density was 772.5 inhabitants per square mile (298.3/km^{2}). There were 362 housing units at an average density of 332.1 per square mile (128.2/km^{2}). The racial makeup of the city was 96.3% White, 1.2% African American, 0.6% Native American, 0.6% Asian, 0.6% from other races, and 0.7% from two or more races. Hispanic or Latino of any race were 1.2% of the population.

There were 337 households, of which 32.6% had children under the age of 18 living with them, 59.6% were married couples living together, 6.2% had a female householder with no husband present, 3.6% had a male householder with no wife present, and 30.6% were non-families. 25.2% of all households were made up of individuals, and 11% had someone living alone who was 65 years of age or older. The average household size was 2.50 and the average family size was 3.01.

The median age in the city was 38.4 years. 26% of residents were under the age of 18; 6.7% were between the ages of 18 and 24; 26.5% were from 25 to 44; 27.1% were from 45 to 64; and 13.8% were 65 years of age or older. The gender makeup of the city was 51.0% male and 49.0% female.

=== 2000 census ===
As of the census of 2000, there were 778 people, 312 households, and 214 families living in the city. The population density was 795.7 inhabitants per square mile (307.2/km^{2}). There were 335 housing units at an average density of 342.6 per square mile (132.3/km^{2}). The racial makeup of the city was 97.69% White, 0.39% African American, 1.29% Native American, 0.13% from other races, and 0.51% from two or more races. Hispanic or Latino of any race were 0.77% of the population.

There were 312 households, out of which 36.2% had children under the age of 18 living with them, 55.8% were married couples living together, 8.7% had a female householder with no husband present, and 31.4% were non-families. 28.5% of all households were made up of individuals, and 12.8% had someone living alone who was 65 years of age or older. The average household size was 2.49 and the average family size was 3.06.

In the city, the population was spread out, with 29.2% under the age of 18, 7.6% from 18 to 24, 28.8% from 25 to 44, 20.2% from 45 to 64, and 14.3% who were 65 years of age or older. The median age was 36 years. For every 100 females, there were 99.0 males. For every 100 females age 18 and over, there were 98.9 males.

The median income for a household in the city was $36,375, and the median income for a family was $46,250. Males had a median income of $30,208 versus $21,607 for females. The per capita income for the city was $17,509. About 5.7% of families and 7.4% of the population were below the poverty line, including 8.7% of those under age 18 and 20.5% of those age 65 or over.

== Education ==
Students attend the Zumbrota-Mazeppa Public schools jointly with students from the nearby town of Zumbrota as of fall 1987. Their mascot, the cougar, is a deviation from the original mascot of the Indians for Mazeppa and the tigers for Zumbrota. The present school colors are blue and silver.

== Notable residents ==
- Stub Allison (1892–1961), football, basketball, and baseball coach
