= 1883 Rochester tornado =

Windstorm in Minnesota, United States

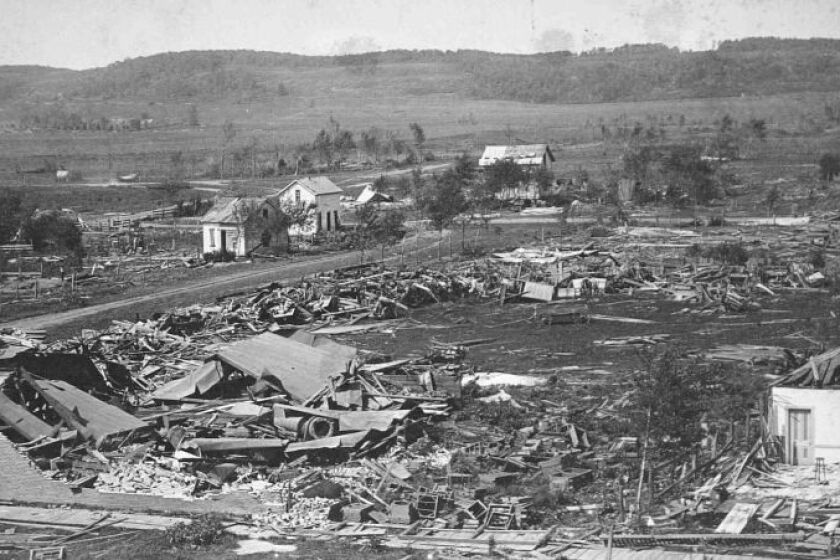
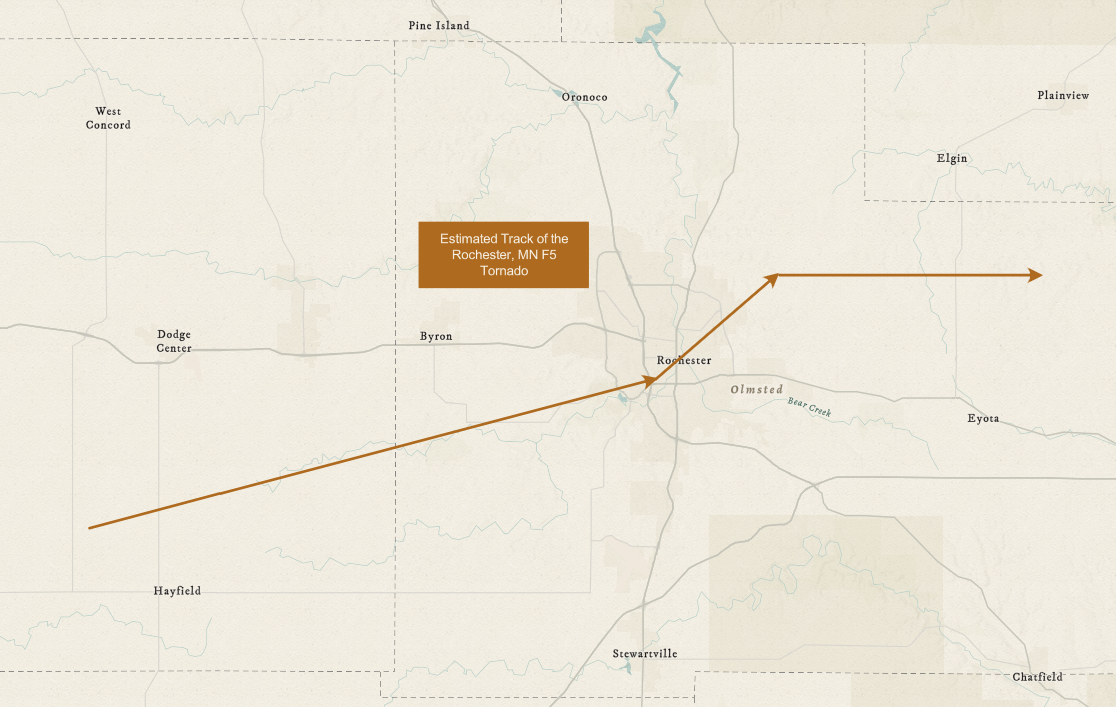
- Top: Damage to residential areas of Rochester following the tornado Bottom: The official track of the Rochester tornado

Meteorological history
- Date: August 21, 1883
- Formed: August 21, 1883, 6:30 p.m. CDT (UTC−05:00)
- Dissipated: August 21, 1883 9:30 p.m. CDT (UTC−05:00)
- Duration: 3 hours

F5 equiv. tornado
- Highest winds: >260 mph (418 km/h)

Overall effects
- Fatalities: ≥ 37
- Injuries: ≥ 200
- Damage: $700,000 (1887 USD) (Note: All losses are in 1965 USD unless otherwise noted.) $25.1 million (2025 USD)
- Areas affected: Dodge and Olmsted Counties, Minnesota (particularly the city of Rochester)
- Part of the Tornado outbreaks of 1883

On August 21, 1883, a violent and devastating tornado affected southeastern portions of the U.S. state of Minnesota. The massive tornado, retrospectively estimated to have been an F5 on the modern Fujita scale, (Note: The Fujita scale was devised under the aegis of scientist T. Theodore Fujita in the early 1970s. Prior to the advent of the scale in 1971, tornadoes in the United States were officially unrated. While the Fujita scale has been superseded by the Enhanced Fujita scale in the U.S. since February 1, 2007, Canada utilized the old scale until April 1, 2013; nations elsewhere, like the United Kingdom, apply other classifications such as the TORRO scale.) caused at least 37 deaths and over 200 injuries. The tornado was part of a tornado family, a series of tornadoes produced by a supercell, that included at least two significant tornadoes across Southeast Minnesota on August 21. A third significant tornado occurred two hours before the main event hit Rochester. The Rochester tornado indirectly led to the formation of Saint Mary's Hospital, now part of the Mayo Clinic. The tornado closely followed destructive tornadoes a month earlier in the same area: on July 21, two significant, deadly tornadoes hit the area, including an F4 tornado family that killed four people in Dodge and Olmsted Counties, especially near Dodge Center.

== Meteorological synopsis ==
On the morning of August 21, a mid-latitude, deepening low-pressure center moved east-northeastward toward Minnesota, crossing the state during the afternoon and evening. The following morning, the cyclone had already deepened to at most 29.42 inHg (996 mb), suggesting a robust system on the preceding day. At the time, surface weather data from the Upper Mississippi Valley were sparse, but nearby observations in the afternoon indicated high temperatures in the middle 80s to low 90s °F. Eyewitnesses reported very humid conditions, indicating ample moisture for thunderstorms to develop. As author Joseph Leonard mentioned in the History of Olmsted County, Minnesota,

At Rochester the day had been hot with a strong southeast wind, the air was smoky and oppressive, the heavens were overcast with clouds of a dull leaden line, and there were, apparently, three strata, all moving in different directions.

Although meteorology in 1883 was primitive compared with modern science, Leonard's observations and other weather reports reveal quite a bit about the atmospheric conditions in Southeastern Minnesota on August 21. High temperatures, sufficient humidity, strong surface winds, and vertical wind shear appear to have all been present—all of which are key factors in the development of tornadoes.

== Tornado Summary ==
By 4:00 p.m. CDT (21:00 UTC), light rain began falling over the area, and at 4:30 p.m. CDT (21:30 UTC), a thunderstorm spawned an F3 tornado about 10 mi (16 km) south of Rochester, near Pleasant Grove. The tornado killed two people, injured ten others, and damaged at least four farmsteads, one of which it destroyed. After the passage of the storm, conditions briefly improved. At about 6:00 p.m. CDT (23:00 UTC), residents of Rochester noticed a "low bank of cloud"—a thunderstorm—southwest of the city. Few residents were alarmed, but the storm rapidly grew in size and intensity as time passed.

The Rochester tornado first touched down at about 6:30 p.m. CDT (23:30 UTC), approximately 4 mi (6.4 km) northwest of Hayfield in Dodge County. The tornado damaged farmsteads in Westfield, Hayfield, Ashland, Vernon, and Canisteo townships. In all, the tornado passed through 40 farms across Dodge County, at least 10 of which it razed, killing five or more people.

As it entered Olmsted County, the tornado obliterated farmhouses, outbuildings, and machinery in Salem Township, causing one death. The tornado continued to destroy structures on farms in Kalmar, Cascade, and Rochester townships before entering the city of Rochester itself. Heavy rainfall preceded the tornado.

Just after 7:00 p.m. CDT (00:00 UTC), skies in Rochester assumed a greenish tint, and a rumbling sound became audible. The "roar" of the tornado gave many residents advance warning. "Dense darkness" enveloped the city as the tornado struck. In just five minutes, the tornado passed through the north side of Rochester, causing devastating damage. The northern third of Rochester was devastated, with 135 homes destroyed and 200 damaged. The tornado also caused extensive damage to a 1-mile-wide (1.6 km) swath that extended 10 mi (16 km) eastward from Rochester.

At 9:30 p.m. CDT (02:00 UTC), a final tornado, given an F3 rating upon retrospective review, killed one person and injured 19 others near St. Charles and Lewiston in Winona County.

Confirmed tornadoes by Fujita rating
FU	F0	F1	F2	F3	F4	F5	Total
0	0	0	0	2	0	1	3
"FU" denotes unclassified but confirmed tornadoes.

== Impact, aftermath, and recovery ==
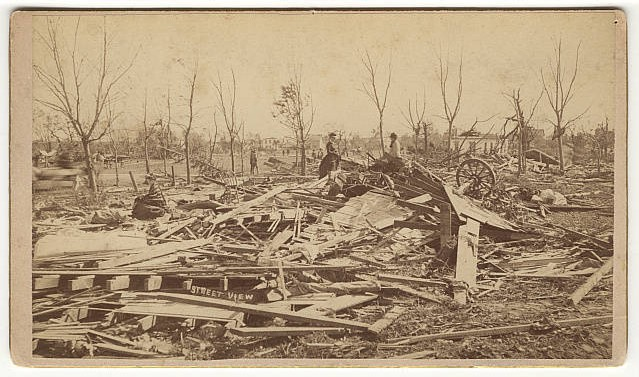
Damage in Rochester, MN after the tornado

The city of Rochester did not have a place to treat the injured from this tornado, as all but three of Minnesota's hospitals were located in Minneapolis–Saint Paul at that time, and none of the remainder was sited near Rochester. Following the tornado, a dance hall in Rochester, Rommel Hall, served as a makeshift emergency room. Local doctors assumed responsibility for the patients' wellbeing under the direction of Rochester Mayor Samuel Whitten; Mother Mary Alfred Moes of the Sisters of St. Francis cared for the patients. Subsequently, the Sisters of St. Francis established St. Mary's Hospital, which ultimately yielded the Mayo Clinic and later the Tornado Guild, the latter of which was dedicated to tornado preparedness.

== See also ==
- Climate of Minnesota
- List of F5 and EF5 tornadoes
- Lists of tornadoes and tornado outbreaks
  - List of North American tornadoes and tornado outbreaks
