= Eden, Minnesota =

Unincorporated community in Minnesota, United States

Eden
- Unincorporated community
- Location within Minnesota Location within the United States
- Coordinates: 44°05′17″N 92°53′06″W
- Country: United States
- State: Minnesota
- County: Dodge
- Township: Wasioja Township
- Elevation: 1,220 ft (370 m)
- Time zone: UTC-6 (Central (CST))
  - Summer (DST): UTC-5 (CDT)
- ZIP code: 55927
- Area code: 507
- GNIS feature ID: 654685

Eden is an unincorporated community in Wasioja Township, Dodge County, Minnesota, United States. The community is located along Dodge County Road 16 near its junction with State Highway 56 (MN 56) and Dodge County Road G. Nearby places include Dodge Center, Wasioja, and West Concord. The South Branch Middle Fork of the Zumbro River flows nearby.

== History ==
Eden was named established as a railroad station, and named by railroad officials. The post office at Eden was called Cheney. The Cheney post office was in operation between 1886 and 1924.
