= Concord, Minnesota =

Unincorporated community in Minnesota, United States

Concord
- Unincorporated community
- Location within Minnesota Location within the United States
- Coordinates: 44°08′51″N 92°50′11″W
- Country: United States
- State: Minnesota
- County: Dodge
- Township: Concord Township
- Elevation: 1,161 ft (354 m)
- Time zone: UTC-6 (Central (CST))
  - Summer (DST): UTC-5 (CDT)
- ZIP code: 55985
- Area code: 507
- GNIS feature ID: 641431

Concord is an unincorporated community in Concord Township, Dodge County, Minnesota, United States. The community is located near the junction of Dodge County Road 24 and 201st Avenue. County Roads 9 and 22 are also in the immediate area. The Middle Fork of the Zumbro River flows through the community. Nearby places include West Concord, Berne, and Wasioja.

== History ==
Concord was platted in 1856. A post office was established at Concord in 1856, and remained in operation until 1906.

Historical population
Census	Pop.	Note	%±
1880	144		—
U.S. Decennial Census
