= Rice Lake State Park =

State park in Minnesota, United States

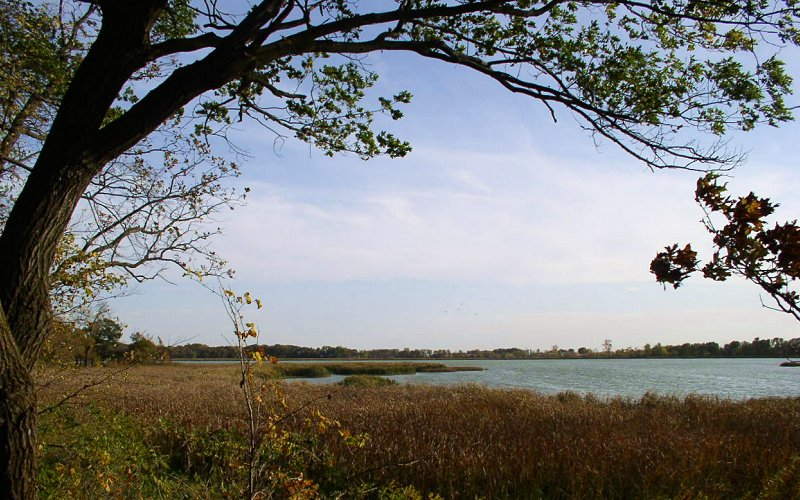
- Rice Lake is a shallow, marsh-ringed lake

- Location within Minnesota Location within the United States
- Location: Minnesota, United States
- Coordinates: 44°5′16″N 93°3′31″W
- Area: 1,071 acres (4.33 km^{2})
- Elevation: 1,257 ft (383 m)
- Established: 1963
- Governing body: Minnesota Department of Natural Resources

Rice Lake State Park is a state park of Minnesota, United States, just east of Owatonna. Park lands entirely surround Rice Lake, an important stopping point for migrating waterfowl. The lake covers 750 acres (300 ha) with an average depth of three feet (1 m).

== Natural history ==
The park's bedrock is limestone laid down 500 million years ago as organic sediments settled to the bottom of a shallow sea that covered much of the Midwest. This limestone is entirely covered by glacial till deposited during a Pre-Illinoian glaciation about 400,000 years ago. As those glaciers were retreating, a block of ice broke off and remained embedded in the till. The ice melted, forming a kettle which became Rice Lake. 10,000 years ago the more recent Wisconsin glaciation missed Rice Lake, passing to the west of the park. Meltwater from that glacier eroded streambeds into the Kansan till.

Rice Lake is the headwaters of the South Branch, Middle Fork of the Zumbro River. This east flowing stream was the lake's original outlet. After the Wisconsin glacier passed, the land to the west was lowered and a second outlet formed that flowed west into another watershed. This outlet feeds the Straight River, a tributary of the Cannon River.

In historical times, Rice Lake may have been as much as 55 feet (17 m) deep, but has filled in considerably due to human influence and the process of eutrophication. Today, Rice Lake is ringed with marsh vegetation. The marshy, shallow nature of the lake, as well as its being the only large lake in the area, make it ideal for migrating waterfowl. Whistling swans, Canada and snow geese, diving ducks, western and pied-billed grebes, and black terns are frequent visitors.

The park lands are covered in a hardwood forest of maple, basswood, elm, and oak, with some meadow openings. However this is not representative of the area's pre-settlement vegetation, which would have been oak savanna with somewhat denser tree growth on the east side of the lake. The water buffered the eastern shore against wildfires burning in from the prairie to the southwest.

== Cultural history ==
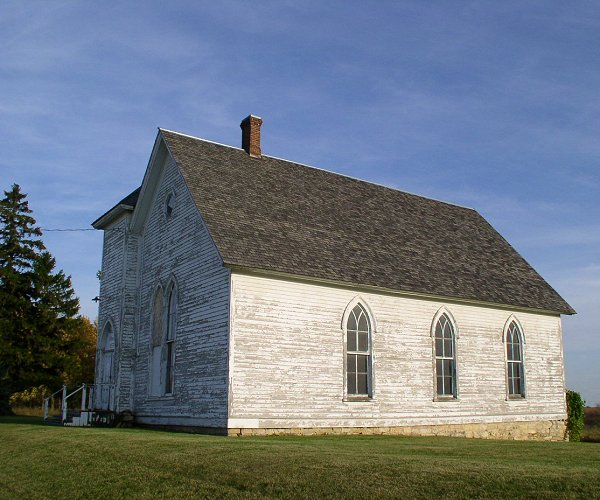
Rice Lake Church, built in 1857

Wild rice grows naturally in the lake, hence its English name. Native Americans in the area harvested the rice as an important food source. The Treaty of Mendota in 1851 opened up southern Minnesota to European settlement. In 1854, the village of Rice Lake arose on the northeast shore of the lake, along an important stagecoach route. The village was expected to grow significantly for a rail line was planned to pass through, but the line was ultimately laid farther south and Rice Lake was soon abandoned. The one surviving structure from the village of Rice Lake is a Methodist church built in 1857, which still stands in the northeast corner of the state park. In 2008, local volunteers gave the church a new foundation and did other preservation work, though it is no longer regularly used for worship.

Rice Lake's other outlets were dammed and diked in the 1870s to channel more flow down the eastern outlet to power a mill in Wasioja. Nevertheless, the water level would periodically drop too low to run the mill, and it went out of business, later burning down in 1891. Most of the water control structures remained in place, however, limiting outflow and resulting in eutrophication from accumulated agricultural runoff. Rice Lake grew progressively shallower as it filled in with dead vegetation.

In the 20th century, Rice Lake became a recreational destination in the area, for although it was filling in, it was one of the few lakes in southeast Minnesota. The Izaak Walton League owned 50 acres (200,000 m^{2}) on the north shore, and another fishing and hunting club owned other lakefront. In 1961, the newspaper editor in Claremont, Dana Hinckley, sparked strong local interest in creating a state park around Rice Lake. The idea was appealing for several factors. Owatonna had lost part of Kaplan Woods State Park to construction of Interstate 35, and the Owatonna swimming pool was crowded. Residents expected that the state would dredge Rice Lake to improve boating and swimming. With such support, legislation creating Rice Lake State Park passed in 1963. That same year the shrunken Kaplan Woods State Park was transferred to Owatonna as a city park, known today as Kaplan's Woods Parkway.

The actual purchase of lots from their various private owners proceeded more slowly than local enthusiasm would have indicated. Several owners were reluctant to sell, but by 1967 recreational facilities had been installed in the north central part of the park, mostly on the former Izaak Walton League property. Inholdings have been acquired periodically over the years, but the dream of dredging Rice Lake proved unfeasible. Moreover, the mud, algae, and leeches compromised the lake's appeal as a swimming destination. However, as Rice Lake has become less appealing for human activities, it has become more appealing to waterfowl. Rice Lake State Park has reinvented itself as a birdwatching destination.

== Recreation ==
- Boating: Boat launch. Due to shallowness, canoes and kayaks are recommended. Rental canoes available.
- Camping:
  - Drive-in campground with 42 sites (16 with electrical hookups, 1 handicap accessible).
  - 5 walk-in campsites.
  - 4 cart-in campsites on lakeshore.
  - 5 canoe-in campsites on south shore of lake.
  - 2 group camps, for up to 40 and 20 people.
- Trails: The park has 4 miles (6 km) of hiking trails. In winter 3.5 miles (5.6 km) are groomed for cross-country skiing and 1.5 miles (2.4 km) for snowmobiling.
- Rice Lake is unsuited to fishing or swimming but bullheads are predominate.
