= Rice Lake (ghost town), Minnesota =

Ghost town in Dodge and Steele counties, Minnesota, US

Coordinates: 44°06′38″N 93°02′46″W

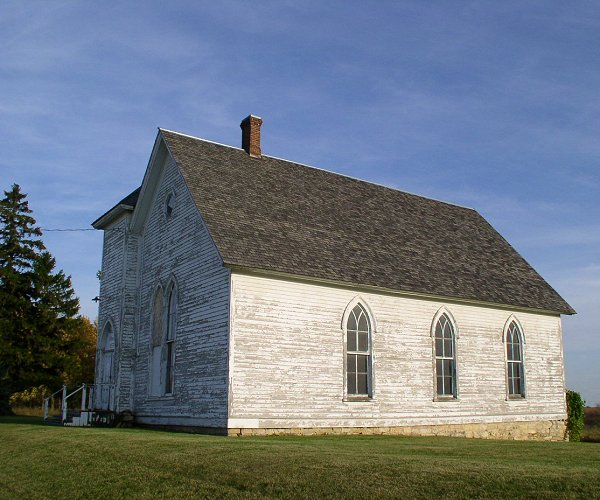
Rice Lake Church

Rice Lake is a ghost town in Dodge and Steele counties in the U.S. state of Minnesota. It is located east of Owatonna, and just north of Rice Lake State Park. The nearest community is the city of Claremont, to the southeast. The Dodge County portion lies in the southwest corner of Ellington Township, while the Steele County portion lies in the southeast corner of Merton Township.

Havana Township and Claremont Township are also in the immediate area.

Historical population
| Census | Pop. | Note | %± |
|---|---|---|---|
| 1860 | 40 | | — |
| 1870 | 51 | | 27.5% |
U.S. Decennial Census

== History ==
Rice Lake was officially platted in 1857, although it started thriving two years before then. Stephen L. Wilson opened the first store, and became postmaster in 1857. After that, a number of businesses continued to develop until 1865, when a railroad bypassed the settlement, causing the village to disappear.

All that remains from the village of Rice Lake is a Carpenter Gothic Methodist church built in 1857 and a small cemetery in the northeast corner of the state park.

== See also ==
- Rice Lake State Park
