= Oslo, Dodge County, Minnesota =

Unincorporated community in Minnesota, United States

Oslo
- Unincorporated community
- Location within Minnesota Location within the United States
- Coordinates: 43°53′32″N 92°44′19″W
- Country: United States
- State: Minnesota
- County: Dodge
- Township: Vernon Township
- Elevation: 1,296 ft (395 m)
- Time zone: UTC-6 (Central (CST))
  - Summer (DST): UTC-5 (CDT)
- ZIP code: 55940
- Area code: 507
- GNIS feature ID: 654863

Oslo is an unincorporated community in Vernon Township, Dodge County, Minnesota, United States, near Hayfield. The community is located near the junction of State Highway 30 (MN 30) and Dodge County Road 13. The South Fork of the Zumbro River flows nearby.

== History ==
A post office was established at Oslo in 1879, and remained in operation until 1902. The community was named after Oslo, in Norway.
