= Masten =

Masten may refer to:

== Places ==
- Masten, Pennsylvania, USA; a ghost town
- Masten Creek, a stream in Minnesota, USA

== People ==
- Chris Masten (born 1969) Aussie-rules player
- Joseph G. Masten (1809–1871) Mayor of Buffalo, New York

== Other uses ==
- Masten Space Systems, an aerospace manufacturer
- Masten-Quinn House in Wurtsboro, NY, USA

== See also ==
- Mastens Corner, Delaware, USA; an unincorporated community in Kent County
- Masten Gregory (1932-1985) F1 racecar driver from the U.S.
- Peter Masten Dunne (1889-1957) U.S. historian
