= National Register of Historic Places listings in Dodge County, Minnesota =

Location of Dodge County in Minnesota

This is a list of the National Register of Historic Places listings in Dodge County, Minnesota. It is intended to be a complete list of the properties and districts on the National Register of Historic Places in Dodge County, Minnesota, United States. The locations of National Register properties and districts for which the latitude and longitude coordinates are included below, may be seen in an online map.

There are 10 properties and districts listed on the National Register in the county. A supplementary list includes two additional sites that were formerly listed on the National Register.

This National Park Service list is complete through NPS recent listings posted October 9, 2026.

== Current listings ==
	Name on the Register	Image	Date listed	Location	City or town	Description
1	Eureka Hotel	Eureka Hotel	April 16, 1982 (#82002941)	101 3rd Ave. SW. 44°01′42″N 92°45′08″W	Kasson	Trackside hotel built in 1894, emblematic of Kasson's railroad era and the commerce it supported.
2	Kasson Municipal Building	Kasson Municipal Building	April 16, 1982 (#82002942)	12 W. Main St. 44°01′45″N 92°45′01″W	Kasson	Multipurpose municipal building constructed in 1917, significant for its Prairie School design by Purcell & Elmslie and its association with Kasson's local government.
3	Kasson Public School	Kasson Public School	December 6, 2007 (#07001242)	101 3rd Ave. NW. 44°01′51″N 92°45′09″W	Kasson	Kasson's only educational institution from 1918 to 1954, hosting elementary through high school, plus teacher training, agricultural extension, and public health services, as well as numerous community events.
4	Kasson Water Tower	Kasson Water Tower	June 3, 1976 (#76001051)	4th Ave. NW. 44°01′52″N 92°45′11″W	Kasson	1895 water tower with a unique limestone base—a local landmark and south-central Minnesota's only unaltered early water tower.
5	Jacob Leuthold Jr. House	Jacob Leuthold Jr. House	April 16, 1982 (#82002943)	108 2nd Ave. NW. 44°01′52″N 92°45′01″W	Kasson	1905 house designed by architects Kees & Colburn for Jacob Leuthold, Jr., who established one of the nation's first clothing chain stores from 1878 to the 1890s.
6	Mantorville and Red Wing Stage Road-Mantorville Section	Mantorville and Red Wing Stage Road-Mantorville Section	August 30, 1991 (#91001062)	Northern side of 5th St. east of its junction with Minnesota Highway 57; 44°04′04″N 92°45′06″W	Mantorville	600-foot (180 m) segment of a stagecoach road built in 1855—a key trade route that helped spur development in the region.
7	Mantorville Historic District	Mantorville Historic District	June 28, 1974 (#74001017)	Both sides of Minnesota Highway 57 and 5th St. 44°04′00″N 92°45′19″W	Mantorville	Highly intact city center with 24 contributing properties built 1854–1918, including the prestigious 1857 Hubbell House hotel, Minnesota's oldest operating courthouse, and the homes of notable figures such as lawyer Cordenio Severance and artist Arnold Blanch.
8	Perry Nelson House	Perry Nelson House	April 16, 1982 (#82002939)	21688 County Highway 22; 44°08′19″N 92°48′18″W	West Concord	Distinctive early-1870s farmhouse noted for its Italianate architecture and association with the New Englanders that settled the area.
9	Wasioja Historic District	Wasioja Historic District	March 13, 1975 (#75000977)	County Highway 16; 44°04′50″N 92°49′08″W	Wasioja	Six remnants of a frontier village founded in 1854 and nearly abandoned by the 1870s: a church, stone house, school, limestone kiln, ruins of a seminary, and Minnesota's only known surviving Civil War Recruiting Station.
10	West Concord High School	West Concord High School	January 19, 2021 (#100006007)	600 1st St. W. 44°08′55″N 92°54′04″W	West Concord	1902 school expanded in 1914 and 1936—significant in public education for housing all local grades until 1958 and for reflecting statewide educational trends throughout the first half of the 20th century. Now a museum and community center.

== Former listings ==
	Name on the Register	Image	Date listed	Date removed	Location	City or town	Description
1	Ole Carlson House	Ole Carlson House	April 16, 1982 (#82002944)	April 17, 2025	68716 270th Ave. 43°57′15″N 92°41′52″W	Canisteo Township	Prominent 1880 farmhouse built by Ole Anderson Aasved for prosperous farmer Ole Carlson, both members of the local Norwegian American community. Demolished in the early 2020s.
2	Andrew Holterman House		April 16, 1982 (#82002940)	June 5, 2000	SR 30	Hayfield vicinity	1878 Italianate house. Moved in the 1990s.

== See also ==
- List of National Historic Landmarks in Minnesota
- National Register of Historic Places listings in Minnesota
