= Jarrett, Minnesota =

Unincorporated community in Minnesota, United States

Jarrett
- Unincorporated community
- Location within Minnesota Location within the United States
- Coordinates: 44°14′10″N 92°20′21″W
- Country: United States
- State: Minnesota
- County: Wabasha County
- Township: Hyde Park Township and Zumbro Township
- Elevation: 794 ft (242 m)
- Time zone: UTC-6 (Central (CST))
  - Summer (DST): UTC-5 (CDT)
- ZIP code: 55991 and 55957
- Area code: 507
- GNIS feature ID: 645581

Jarrett is an unincorporated community in Wabasha County, Minnesota, United States.

== Geography ==
The community is located between Hammond and Millville along Wabasha County Road 11 near the intersection with 334th Avenue. Jarrett is located within Hyde Park Township and Zumbro Township. Silver Spring Creek and the Zumbro River meet at Jarrett. Other nearby communities include Millville, Hammond, Zumbro Falls, Potsdam, and South Troy.

== History ==
A post office called Jarretts was established in 1879, and remained in operation until 1919. The community took its name from Jarrett's Ford, a shallow crossing over the Zumbro River.
