= Hayfield Township =

Hayfield Township may refer to the following townships in the United States:

- Hayfield Township, Crawford County, Pennsylvania
- Hayfield Township, Dodge County, Minnesota
