= Vlasaty, Minnesota =

Unincorporated community in Minnesota, United States

Vlasaty
- Unincorporated community
- Location within Minnesota Location within the United States
- Coordinates: 43°57′53″N 92°50′57″W
- Country: United States
- State: Minnesota
- County: Dodge
- Elevation: 1,332 ft (406 m)
- Time zone: UTC-6 (Central (CST))
  - Summer (DST): UTC-5 (CDT)
- Area code: 507
- GNIS feature ID: 654989

Vlasaty is an unincorporated community in Dodge County, in the U.S. state of Minnesota.

== History ==
A post office was established at Vlasaty in 1896, and remained in operation until 1906. The community was named by a railroad official.
