= Berne, Minnesota =

Unincorporated community in Minnesota, United States

Berne
- Unincorporated community
- Location within Minnesota Location within the United States
- Coordinates: 44°09′49″N 92°46′46″W
- Country: United States
- State: Minnesota
- County: Dodge
- Township: Milton Township
- Named after: Bern, Switzerland
- Elevation: 1,122 ft (342 m)
- Time zone: UTC-6 (Central (CST))
  - Summer (DST): UTC-5 (CDT)
- ZIP code: 55985
- Area code: 507
- GNIS feature ID: 639971

Berne is an unincorporated community in Milton Township, Dodge County, Minnesota, United States. The community is located near the junction of State Highway 57 (MN 57) and Dodge County Road 24. The Middle Fork of the Zumbro River flows nearby.

== History ==
A post office called Berne was established in 1858, and remained in operation until 1902. The community was named after Bern, in Switzerland.
