= Ripley Township, Dodge County, Minnesota =

Ripley Township, Minnesota
- Township
- Location within the state of Minnesota Ripley Township, Minnesota (the United States)
- Coordinates: 43°59′38″N 92°58′31″W
- Country: United States
- State: Minnesota
- County: Dodge

Area
  - Total: 36.1 sq mi (93.6 km^{2})
  - Land: 36.1 sq mi (93.6 km^{2})
  - Water: 0 sq mi (0.0 km^{2})
- Elevation: 1,276 ft (389 m)

Population (2000)
  - Total: 212
  - Density: 6.0/sq mi (2.3/km^{2})
- Time zone: UTC-6 (Central (CST))
  - Summer (DST): UTC-5 (CDT)
- FIPS code: 27-54502
- GNIS feature ID: 0665421

Ripley Township is a township in Dodge County, Minnesota, United States. The population was 212 at the 2000 census.

Ripley Township was organized in 1858.

== Geography ==
According to the United States Census Bureau, the township has a total area of 36.2 square miles (93.6 km^{2}), all land.

== Demographics ==
As of the census of 2000, there were 212 people, 73 households, and 61 families residing in the township. The population density was 5.9 people per square mile (2.3/km^{2}). There were 101 housing units at an average density of 2.8/sq mi (1.1/km^{2}). The racial makeup of the township was 96.70% White, 3.30% from other races. Hispanic or Latino of any race were 3.30% of the population.

There were 73 households, out of which 37.0% had children under the age of 18 living with them, 76.7% were married couples living together, 2.7% had a female householder with no husband present, and 15.1% were non-families. 11.0% of all households were made up of individuals, and 4.1% had someone living alone who was 65 years of age or older. The average household size was 2.86 and the average family size was 3.02.

In the township the population was spread out, with 27.8% under the age of 18, 5.2% from 18 to 24, 34.0% from 25 to 44, 18.4% from 45 to 64, and 14.6% who were 65 years of age or older. The median age was 35 years. For every 100 females, there were 101.9 males. For every 100 females age 18 and over, there were 104.0 males.

The median income for a household in the township was $42,500, and the median income for a family was $46,250. Males had a median income of $30,250 versus $31,875 for females. The per capita income for the township was $18,240. About 7.4% of families and 9.0% of the population were below the poverty line, including 10.2% of those under the age of eighteen and 6.1% of those 65 or over.
