= Danesville, Minnesota =

Unincorporated community in Minnesota, United States

Danesville
- Unincorporated community
- Location within Minnesota Location within the United States
- Coordinates: 44°05′38″N 92°40′44″W
- Country: United States
- State: Minnesota
- Counties: Dodge and Olmsted
- Elevation: 1,230 ft (370 m)
- Time zone: UTC-6 (Central (CST))
  - Summer (DST): UTC-5 (CDT)
- Area code: 507
- GNIS feature ID: 654666

Danesville is an unincorporated community in Dodge and Olmsted counties, Minnesota, United States.
