= Milliken Creek (Minnesota) =

Stream in Dodge County, Minnesota, U.S.

Coordinates: 44°10′0.25″N 92°44′58.97″W

Milliken Creek is a stream in Dodge County, in the U.S. state of Minnesota.

Milliken Creek was named for an early settler.

== See also ==
- List of rivers of Minnesota
