= Mantorville Township, Dodge County, Minnesota =

Mantorville Township, Minnesota
- Township
- Location within the state of Minnesota Mantorville Township, Minnesota (the United States)
- Coordinates: 44°3′30″N 92°44′22″W
- Country: United States
- State: Minnesota
- County: Dodge

Area
  - Total: 32.5 sq mi (84.1 km^{2})
  - Land: 32.4 sq mi (84.0 km^{2})
  - Water: 0 sq mi (0.0 km^{2})
- Elevation: 1,198 ft (365 m)

Population (2000)
  - Total: 1,610
  - Density: 50/sq mi (19.2/km^{2})
- Time zone: UTC-6 (Central (CST))
  - Summer (DST): UTC-5 (CDT)
- ZIP code: 55955
- Area code: 507
- FIPS code: 27-40004
- GNIS feature ID: 0664895

Mantorville Township (/ˈmæntərvɪl/ MAN-tər-vil) is a township in Dodge County, Minnesota, United States. The population was 1,610 at the 2000 census.

Mantorville Township organized in 1858.

== Geography ==
According to the United States Census Bureau, the township has a total area of 32.5 square miles (84.1 km^{2}), of which 32.4 square miles (84.0 km^{2}) is land and 0.03% is water.

== Demographics ==
As of the census of 2000, there were 1,610 people, 519 households, and 458 families residing in the township. The population density was 49.6 inhabitants per square mile (19.2/km^{2}). There were 531 housing units at an average density of 16.4 per square mile (6.3/km^{2}). The racial makeup of the township was 98.82% White, 0.06% African American, 0.12% Native American, 0.12% Asian, and 0.87% from two or more races. Hispanic or Latino of any race were 0.25% of the population.

There were 519 households, out of which 51.8% had children under the age of 18 living with them, 81.9% were married couples living together, 3.3% had a female householder with no husband present, and 11.6% were non-families. 9.6% of all households were made up of individuals, and 2.7% had someone living alone who was 65 years of age or older. The average household size was 3.10 and the average family size was 3.30.

In the township the population was spread out, with 34.0% under the age of 18, 5.8% from 18 to 24, 30.8% from 25 to 44, 23.5% from 45 to 64, and 5.8% who were 65 years of age or older. The median age was 35 years. For every 100 females, there were 98.8 males. For every 100 females age 18 and over, there were 103.8 males.

The median income for a household in the township was $62,891, and the median income for a family was $66,125. Males had a median income of $43,250 versus $30,433 for females. The per capita income for the township was $25,557. About 1.7% of families and 2.0% of the population were below the poverty line, including 0.9% of those under age 18 and 9.1% of those age 65 or over.
