= Wasioja Township, Dodge County, Minnesota =

Wasioja Township, Minnesota
- Township
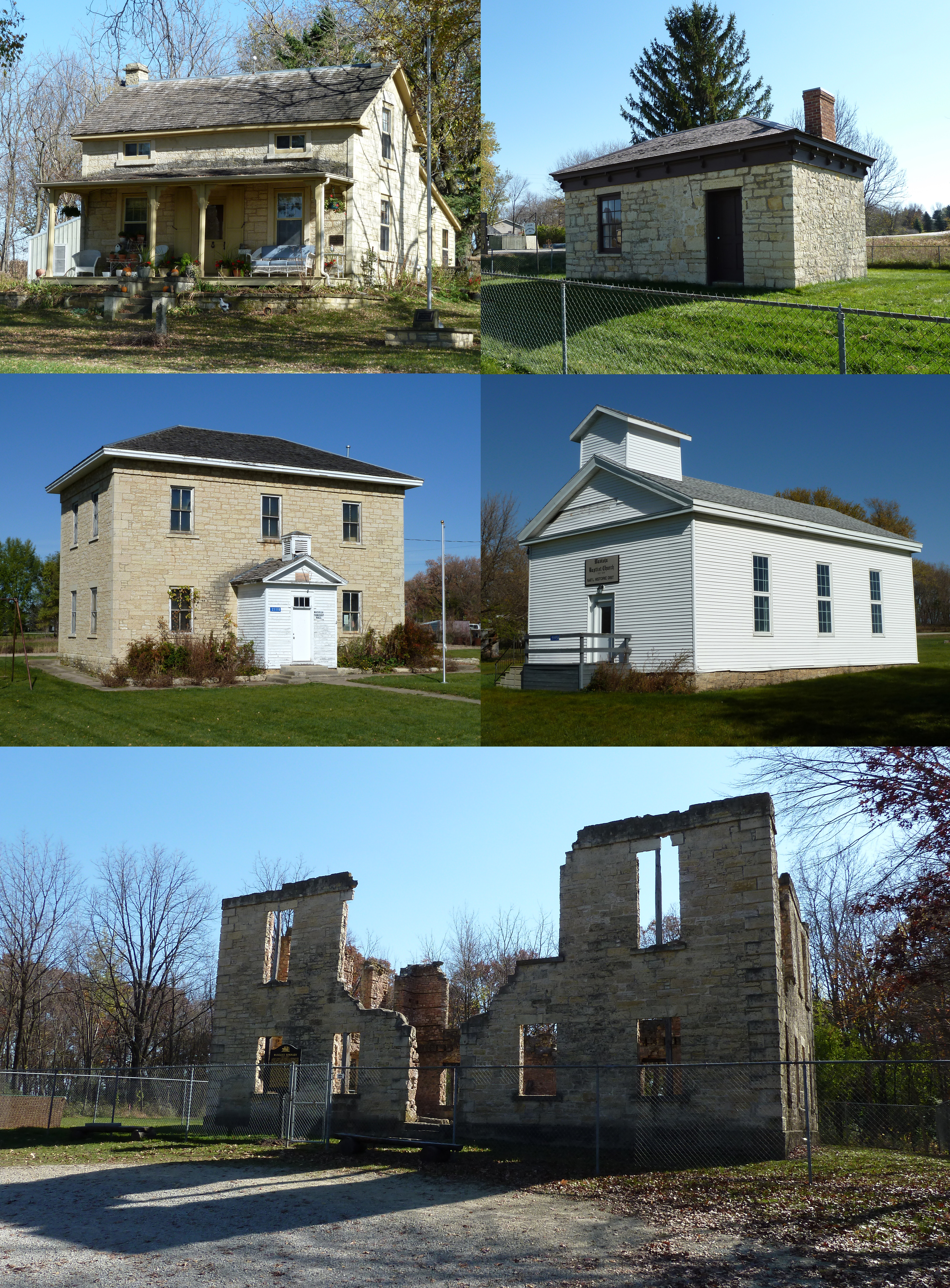
- The Wasioja Historic District is on the National Register of Historic Places and includes (clockwise from top left) the Andrew Doig House (1858), Civil War Recruiting Station (1855), Baptist Church (1858), Seminary ruins (1858), and Wasioja School (1860).

- Location within the state of Minnesota Wasioja Township, Minnesota (the United States)
- Coordinates: 44°3′54″N 92°51′3″W
- Country: United States
- State: Minnesota
- County: Dodge

Area
  - Total: 36.1 sq mi (93.5 km^{2})
  - Land: 36.1 sq mi (93.5 km^{2})
  - Water: 0 sq mi (0.0 km^{2})
- Elevation: 1,201 ft (366 m)

Population (2000)
  - Total: 963
  - Density: 27/sq mi (10.3/km^{2})
- Time zone: UTC-6 (Central (CST))
  - Summer (DST): UTC-5 (CDT)
- ZIP code: 55927
- Area code: 507
- FIPS code: 27-68404
- GNIS feature ID: 0665925

Wasioja Township is a township in Dodge County, Minnesota. The population was 963 at the time of the 2000 census. The unincorporated community of Wasioja is located within the township.

Wasioja Township was organized in 1858. Wasioja is the native Sioux language name for the Zumbro River.

== Geography ==
According to the United States Census Bureau, the township has a total area of 36.1 square miles (93.5 km^{2}), all land.

== Demographics ==
As of the census of 2000, there were 963 people, 326 households, and 280 families residing in the township. The population density was 26.7 inhabitants per square mile (10.3/km^{2}). There were 338 housing units at an average density of 9.4/sq mi (3.6/km^{2}). The racial makeup of the township was 96.99% White, 0.10% African American, 0.93% Asian, 0.73% from other races, and 1.25% from two or more races. Hispanic or Latino of any race were 1.04% of the population.

There were 326 households, out of which 40.2% had children under the age of 18 living with them, 78.5% were married couples living together, 4.9% had a female householder with no husband present, and 14.1% were non-families. 12.3% of all households were made up of individuals, and 4.0% had someone living alone who was 65 years of age or older. The average household size was 2.95 and the average family size was 3.20.

In the township the population was spread out, with 31.0% under the age of 18, 5.5% from 18 to 24, 30.6% from 25 to 44, 23.7% from 45 to 64, and 9.1% who were 65 years of age or older. The median age was 37 years. For every 100 females, there were 106.7 males. For every 100 females age 18 and over, there were 105.6 males.

The median income for a household in the township was $55,714, and the median income for a family was $60,515. Males had a median income of $39,375 versus $25,917 for females. The per capita income for the township was $19,834. About 5.4% of families and 6.3% of the population were below the poverty line, including 6.8% of those under age 18 and 12.4% of those age 65 or over.
