= West Concord Public Library =

Coordinates: 44°09′06.3″N 92°53′57″W

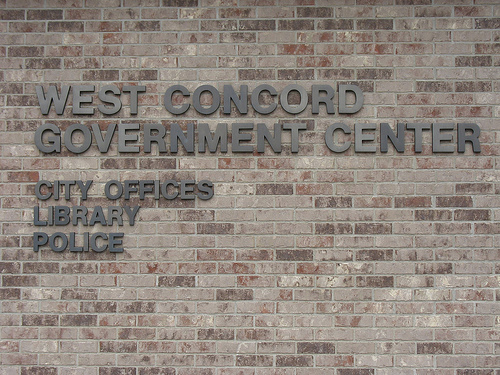
- West Concord Public Library
- Location: 180 Main Street; West Concord, Minnesota 55985

Other information
- Director: Nancy Schollmeier
- Employees: 2
- Website: http://www.westconcordmn.com/index.asp?Type=B_BASIC&SEC={E1E08DA1-8B3D-4CB0-8C6F-4787F2B92AC3}

The West Concord Public Library is a library in West Concord, Minnesota. It is a member of Southeastern Libraries Cooperating, in the southeast Minnesota library region.
