= Vogl House =

Historic house in Delaware, US

- U.S. National Register of Historic Places
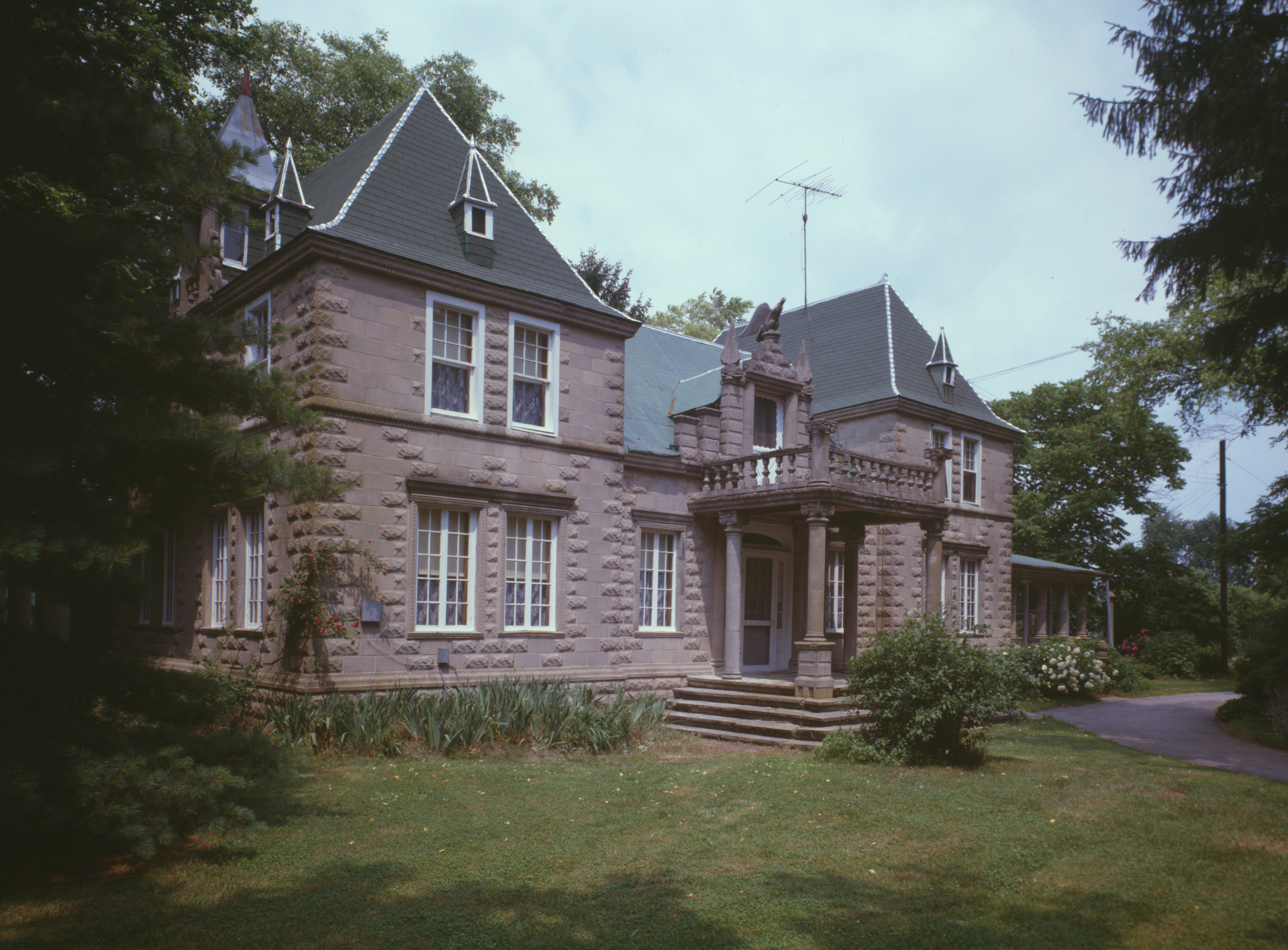
- Vogl House, HABS Photo, July 1982

- Location within Delaware Location within the United States
- Location: West of Masten, near Masten's Corner, Delaware
- Coordinates: 38°57′52″N 75°37′44″W
- Area: 5 acres (2.0 ha)
- Built: 1915
- Architect: Vogl, Wilhelmine; Vogl, John
- NRHP reference No.: 76000570
- Added to NRHP: November 7, 1976

The Vogl House, is a historic home located near Masten's Corner, Kent County, Delaware. It was built by Bavarian immigrants Wilhelmine Vogl and John Vogl in 1915. The H-shaped house consists of two large wings joined by a central section. The house is constructed of concrete block and is a unique folk art house with lavish details.

It was listed on the National Register of Historic Places in 1976. The listing included five contributing buildings and two contributing structures.
