= Milton Township, Dodge County, Minnesota =

Milton Township, Minnesota
- Township
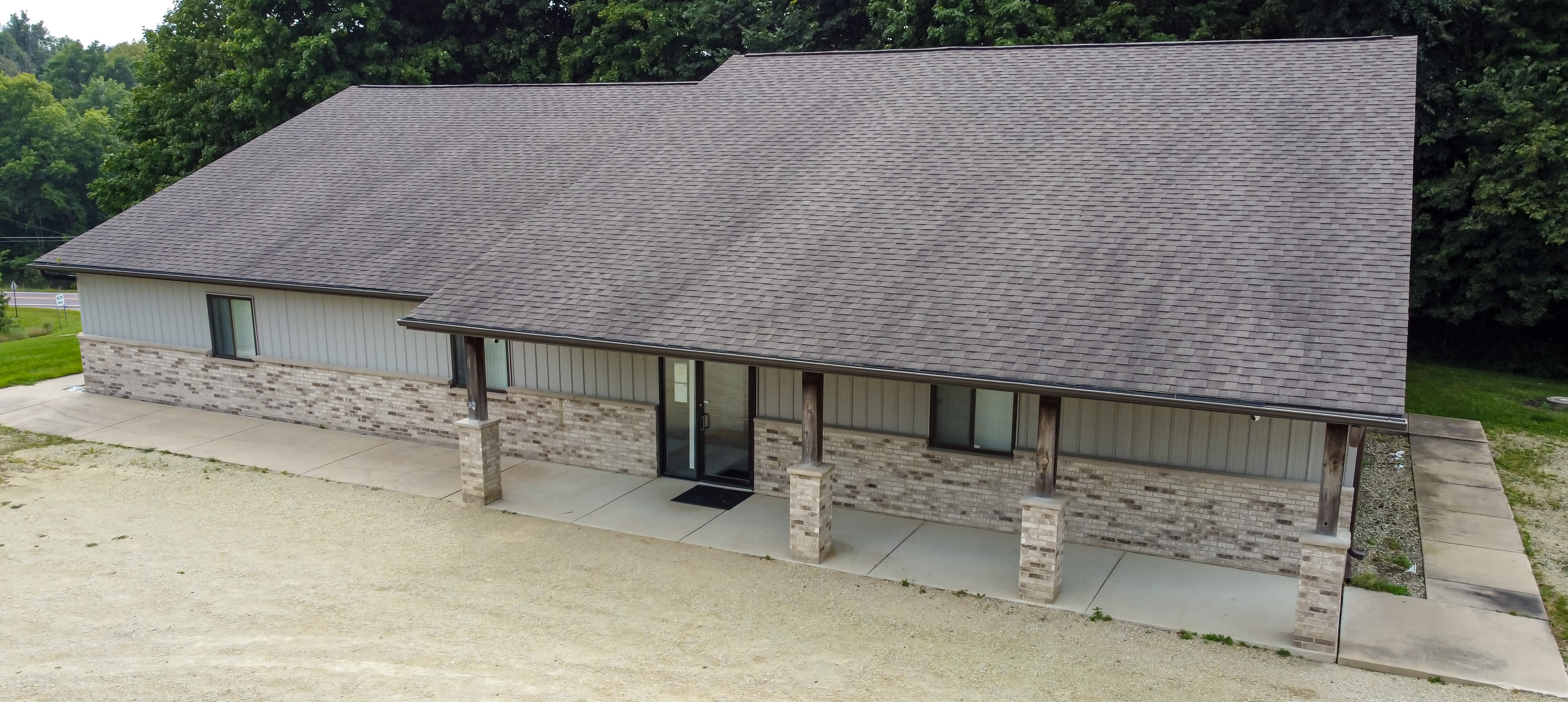
- Town hall

- Location within the state of Minnesota Milton Township, Minnesota (the United States)
- Coordinates: 44°9′2″N 92°44′32″W
- Country: United States
- State: Minnesota
- County: Dodge

Area
  - Total: 36.1 sq mi (93.4 km^{2})
  - Land: 36.0 sq mi (93.2 km^{2})
  - Water: 0.039 sq mi (0.1 km^{2})
- Elevation: 1,188 ft (362 m)

Population (2000)
  - Total: 692
  - Density: 19/sq mi (7.4/km^{2})
- Time zone: UTC-6 (Central (CST))
  - Summer (DST): UTC-5 (CDT)
- FIPS code: 27-42380
- GNIS feature ID: 0664981
- Website: http://www.milton-township.com/

Milton Township is a township in Dodge County, Minnesota, United States. The population was 692 at the 2000 census.

Milton Township was organized in 1858.

== Geography ==
According to the United States Census Bureau, the township has a total area of 36.0 square miles (93.4 km^{2}), of which 36.0 square miles (93.2 km^{2}) is land and 0.1 square mile (0.1 km^{2}) (0.14%) is water.

== Demographics ==
As of the census of 2000, there were 692 people, 246 households, and 196 families residing in the township. The population density was 19.2 people per square mile (7.4/km^{2}). There were 254 housing units at an average density of 7.1/sq mi (2.7/km^{2}). The racial makeup of the township was 96.97% White, 0.58% Asian, 2.17% from other races, and 0.29% from two or more races. Hispanic or Latino of any race were 2.31% of the population.

There were 246 households, out of which 38.2% had children under the age of 18 living with them, 72.0% were married couples living together, 3.7% had a female householder with no husband present, and 20.3% were non-families. 16.7% of all households were made up of individuals, and 6.5% had someone living alone who was 65 years of age or older. The average household size was 2.81 and the average family size was 3.17.

In the township the population was spread out, with 28.9% under the age of 18, 8.8% from 18 to 24, 27.0% from 25 to 44, 25.7% from 45 to 64, and 9.5% who were 65 years of age or older. The median age was 38 years. For every 100 females, there were 104.1 males. For every 100 females age 18 and over, there were 109.4 males.

The median income for a household in the township was $50,000, and the median income for a family was $53,611. Males had a median income of $33,250 versus $25,865 for females. The per capita income for the township was $20,209. About 6.2% of families and 7.9% of the population were below the poverty line, including 7.4% of those under age 18 and 4.8% of those age 65 or over.
