= Hammond, Minnesota =

City in Minnesota, United States

Hammond
- City
- Location of Hammond, Minnesota
- Coordinates: 44°13′21″N 92°22′23″W
- Country: United States
- State: Minnesota
- County: Wabasha

Area
  - Total: 0.18 sq mi (0.46 km^{2})
  - Land: 0.16 sq mi (0.42 km^{2})
  - Water: 0.019 sq mi (0.05 km^{2})
- Elevation: 807 ft (246 m)

Population (2020)
  - Total: 130
  - Density: 811.1/sq mi (313.16/km^{2})
- Time zone: UTC-6 (Central (CST))
  - Summer (DST): UTC-5 (CDT)
- ZIP code: 55991
- Area code: 507
- FIPS code: 27-26828
- GNIS feature ID: 0644609

Hammond is a city in Wabasha County, Minnesota, United States. As of the 2020 census, Hammond had a population of 130.

== History ==
Hammond was named for Joseph Hammond, the original owner of the town site.

In September 2010, the city was evacuated due to flooding of the nearby Zumbro River. About two thirds of the homes in the city were severely damaged.

== Geography ==
According to the United States Census Bureau, the city has a total area of 0.12 square miles (0.31 km^{2}); 0.11 square miles (0.28 km^{2}) is land and 0.01 square miles (0.03 km^{2}) is water.

Wabasha County Roads 6 and 11 are main routes in the community.

== Demographics ==
Historical population
Census	Pop.	Note	%±
1900	238		—
1910	241		1.3%
1920	226		−6.2%
1930	184		−18.6%
1940	252		37.0%
1950	192		−23.8%
1960	205		6.8%
1970	179		−12.7%
1980	178		−0.6%
1990	205		15.2%
2000	198		−3.4%
2010	132		−33.3%
2020	130		−1.5%
U.S. Decennial Census

=== 2010 census ===
As of the census of 2010, there were 132 people, 59 households, and 34 families living in the city. The population density was 1,200.0 inhabitants per square mile (463.3/km^{2}). There were 65 housing units at an average density of 590.9 per square mile (228.1/km^{2}). The racial makeup of the city was 97.0% White and 3.0% from other races. Hispanic or Latino of any race were 5.3% of the population.

There were 59 households, of which 18.6% had children under the age of 18 living with them, 37.3% were married couples living together, 10.2% had a female householder with no husband present, 10.2% had a male householder with no wife present, and 42.4% were non-families. 32.2% of all households were made up of individuals, and 6.8% had someone living alone who was 65 years of age or older. The average household size was 2.24 and the average family size was 2.74.

The median age in the city was 45.7 years. 12.9% of residents were under the age of 18; 8.3% were between the ages of 18 and 24; 27.3% were from 25 to 44; 43.2% were from 45 to 64; and 8.3% were 65 years of age or older. The gender makeup of the city was 53.8% male and 46.2% female.

=== 2000 census ===
As of the census of 2000, there were 198 people, 77 households, and 52 families living in the city. The population density was 1,896.3 inhabitants per square mile (732.2/km^{2}). There were 84 housing units at an average density of 804.5 per square mile (310.6/km^{2}). The racial makeup of the city was 97.98% White, 0.51% African American, 0.51% Native American, 0.51% from other races, and 0.51% from two or more races. Hispanic or Latino of any race were 1.52% of the population.

There were 77 households, out of which 36.4% had children under the age of 18 living with them, 45.5% were married couples living together, 14.3% had a female householder with no husband present, and 31.2% were non-families. 19.5% of all households were made up of individuals, and 3.9% had someone living alone who was 65 years of age or older. The average household size was 2.57 and the average family size was 2.92.

In the city, the population was spread out, with 26.8% under the age of 18, 5.6% from 18 to 24, 38.4% from 25 to 44, 22.2% from 45 to 64, and 7.1% who were 65 years of age or older. The median age was 35 years. For every 100 females, there were 96.0 males. For every 100 females age 18 and over, there were 101.4 males.

The median income for a household in the city was $39,375, and the median income for a family was $38,750. Males had a median income of $30,938 versus $20,625 for females. The per capita income for the city was $18,531. About 12.5% of families and 10.8% of the population were below the poverty line, including 15.8% of those under the age of eighteen and none of those 65 or over.
