= Mastens Corner, Delaware =

Unincorporated community in Delaware, United States

- Unincorporated community
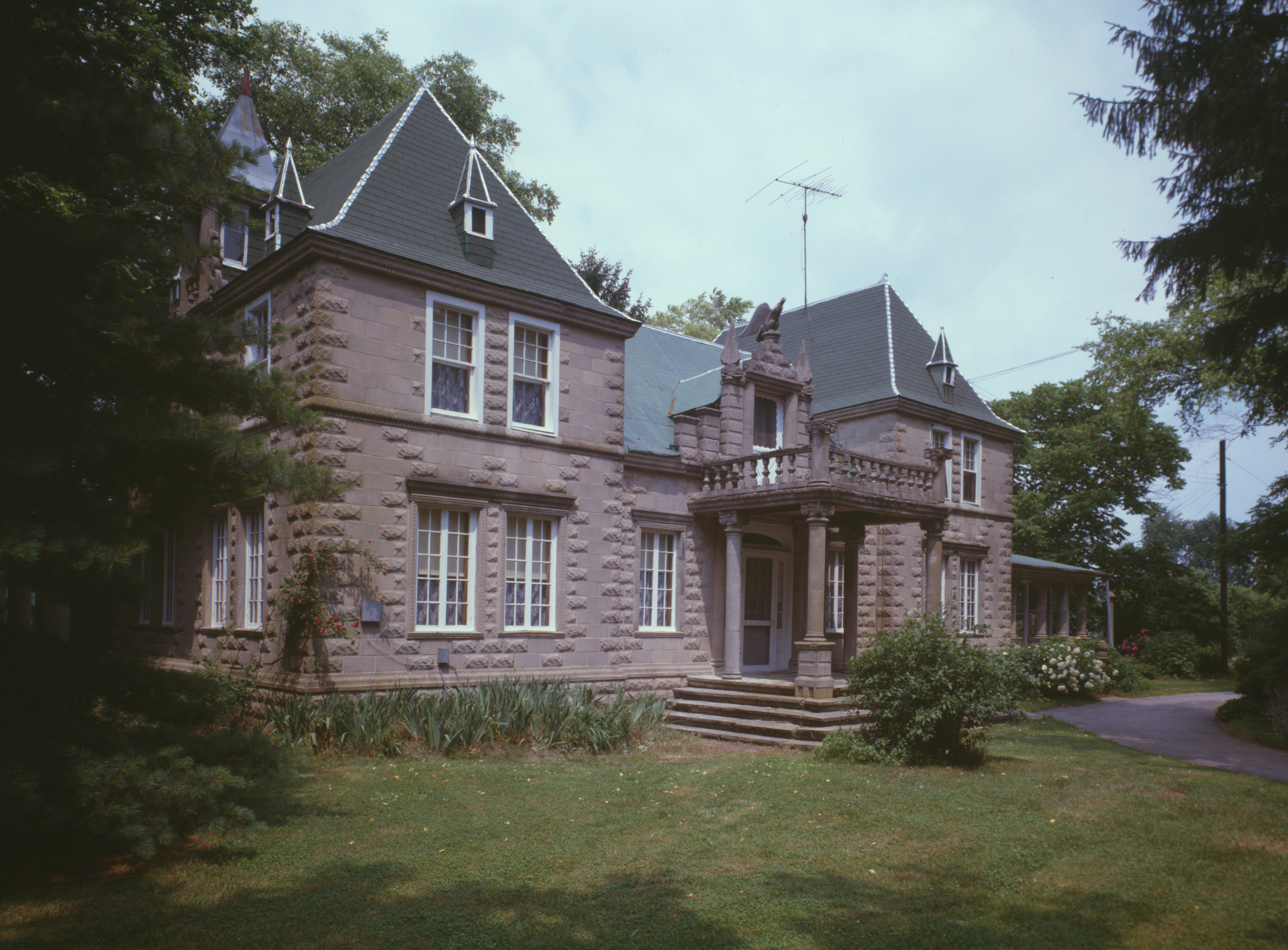
- Vogl House

- Location within Delaware Location within the United States
- Coordinates: 38°58′07″N 75°37′03″W
- Country: United States
- State: Delaware
- County: Kent
- Elevation: 59 ft (18 m)
- Time zone: UTC-5 (Eastern (EST))
  - Summer (DST): UTC-4 (EDT)
- Area code: 302
- GNIS feature ID: 216148

Mastens Corner is an unincorporated community in Kent County, Delaware, United States. Mastens Corner is located at the intersection of Hopkins Cemetery Road and Hills Market Road, 3.8 miles (6.1 km) northwest of Harrington.

The community was named for William Masten, a pioneer settler. The Vogl House, which is listed on the National Register of Historic Places, is located near Mastens Corner.
