= Claremont Township, Dodge County, Minnesota =

Claremont Township, Minnesota
- Township
- Location within the state of Minnesota Claremont Township, Minnesota (the United States)
- Coordinates: 44°3′33″N 92°58′31″W
- Country: United States
- State: Minnesota
- County: Dodge

Area
  - Total: 34.9 sq mi (90.3 km^{2})
  - Land: 34.8 sq mi (90.1 km^{2})
  - Water: 0.039 sq mi (0.1 km^{2})
- Elevation: 1,266 ft (386 m)

Population (2000)
  - Total: 468
  - Density: 13/sq mi (5.2/km^{2})
- Time zone: UTC-6 (Central (CST))
  - Summer (DST): UTC-5 (CDT)
- ZIP code: 55924
- Area code: 507
- FIPS code: 27-11584
- GNIS feature ID: 0663805

Claremont Township is a township in Dodge County, Minnesota, United States. The population was 468 at the 2000 census.

Claremont Township was organized in 1858. It was named after Claremont, New Hampshire.

== Geography ==
According to the United States Census Bureau, the township has a total area of 34.8 square miles (90 km^{2}), of which 34.8 square miles (90 km^{2}) is land and 0.1 square miles (0.26 km^{2}) (0.14%) is water.

== Demographics ==
As of the census of 2000, there were 468 people, 157 households, and 135 families residing in the township. The population density was 13.4 inhabitants per square mile (5.2/km^{2}). There were 161 housing units at an average density of 4.6 per square mile (1.8/km^{2}). The racial makeup of the township was 97.86% White, 0.21% Asian, 1.50% from other races, and 0.43% from two or more races. Hispanic or Latino of any race were 2.35% of the population.

There were 157 households, out of which 43.9% had children under the age of 18 living with them, 79.0% were married couples living together, 5.7% had a female householder with no husband present, and 14.0% were non-families. 12.1% of all households were made up of individuals, and 2.5% had someone living alone who was 65 years of age or older. The average household size was 2.94 and the average family size was 3.18.

In the township the population was spread out, with 28.4% under the age of 18, 9.2% from 18 to 24, 30.1% from 25 to 44, 22.2% from 45 to 64, and 10.0% who were 65 years of age or older. The median age was 36 years. For every 100 females, there were 122.9 males. For every 100 females age 18 and over, there were 120.4 males.

The median income for a household in the township was $63,125, and the median income for a family was $64,167. Males had a median income of $38,068 versus $27,125 for females. The per capita income for the township was $20,532. About 4.3% of families and 6.3% of the population were below the poverty line, including 6.2% of those under age 18 and none of those age 65 or over.
