= Ashland Township, Dodge County, Minnesota =

Ashland Township, Minnesota
- Township
- Location within the state of Minnesota Ashland Township, Minnesota (the United States)
- Coordinates: 43°59′19″N 92°51′51″W
- Country: United States
- State: Minnesota
- County: Dodge

Area
  - Total: 37.4 sq mi (96.8 km^{2})
  - Land: 37.4 sq mi (96.8 km^{2})
  - Water: 0 sq mi (0.0 km^{2})
- Elevation: 1,306 ft (398 m)

Population (2000)
  - Total: 367
  - Density: 9.8/sq mi (3.8/km^{2})
- Time zone: UTC-6 (Central (CST))
  - Summer (DST): UTC-5 (CDT)
- FIPS code: 27-02512
- GNIS feature ID: 0663467

Ashland Township is a township in Dodge County, Minnesota, United States. The population was 367 at the 2000 census.

Ashland Township was organized in 1858.

== Geography ==
According to the United States Census Bureau, Ashland Township has a total area of 37.4 square miles (97 km^{2}), all land.

An 1894 Dodge County plat map showed a village of Ashland in Section 22 of the township (T106N, R17W), but by 1966 it had disappeared from USGS maps, leaving only Vlasaty, a point on the Chicago Great Western Railway, both of which have since then also disappeared.

== Demographics ==
As of the census of 2000, there were 367 people, 123 households, and 101 families residing in the township. The population density was 9.8 inhabitants per square mile (3.8/km^{2}). There were 130 housing units at an average density of 3.5 per square mile (1.4/km^{2}). The racial makeup of the township was 97.28% White, 0.27% Native American, 0.27% Asian, 1.91% from other races, and 0.27% from two or more races. Hispanic or Latino of any race were 4.09% of the population.

There were 123 households, out of which 39.8% had children under the age of 18 living with them, 74.0% were married couples living together, 1.6% had a female householder with no husband present, and 17.1% were non-families. 12.2% of all households were made up of individuals, and 4.9% had someone living alone who was 65 years of age or older. The average household size was 2.98 and the average family size was 3.24.

In the township the population was spread out, with 28.6% under the age of 18, 10.4% from 18 to 24, 26.7% from 25 to 44, 22.6% from 45 to 64, and 11.7% who were 65 years of age or older. The median age was 38 years. For every 100 females, there were 117.2 males. For every 100 females age 18 and over, there were 123.9 males.

The median income for a household in the township was $54,375, and the median income for a family was $57,250. Males had a median income of $30,179 versus $23,750 for females. The per capita income for the township was $18,806. About 6.2% of families and 8.6% of the population were below the poverty line, including 6.7% of those under age 18 and 27.9% of those age 65 or over.
