= Dodge County, Minnesota =

County in Minnesota, United States

- County
- Dodge County Courthouse

- Location within the U.S. state of Minnesota
- Coordinates: 44°02′N 92°52′W
- Country: United States
- State: Minnesota
- Founded: February 20, 1855
- Named for: Henry Dodge
- Seat: Mantorville
- Largest city: Kasson

Area
  - Total: 440 sq mi (1,100 km^{2})
  - Land: 439 sq mi (1,140 km^{2})
  - Water: 0.3 sq mi (0.78 km^{2}) 0.07%

Population (2020)
  - Total: 20,867
  - Estimate (2025): 21,376 ▲
  - Density: 47.5/sq mi (18.3/km^{2})
- Time zone: UTC−6 (Central)
  - Summer (DST): UTC−5 (CDT)
- Congressional district: 1st
- Website: www.co.dodge.mn.us

Dodge County is a county in the U.S. state of Minnesota. The population was 20,867 as of the 2020 census. Its county seat is Mantorville.

Dodge County is part of the Rochester, MN Metropolitan Statistical Area.

== History ==
The area of present Dodge County was a hunting and battle ground for the Mdewakanton Sioux, often fighting Sauk and Meskwaki who wandered into their territory.

Possibly the first non-indigenous person to enter the territory was a French fur trader from Canada in 1655. After the fur trappers and early explorers, the area was populated by settlers from New England.

The 1820s and 1830s saw significant emigration, eased by completion of the Erie Canal (1825) and the end of the Black Hawk War (1831). They brought a passion for education, establishing many schools, as well as staunch support for abolitionism. They were members of the Congregational or Episcopal church. Culturally Dodge County was similar to colonial New England during the nineteenth century.

On July 29, 1837, at Fort Snelling, then in Wisconsin, Governor Henry Dodge the first governor of Wisconsin (1836–1841) made a treaty with the Ojibways, by which they ceded to the United States all their pine lands and agricultural lands on the upper part of the St. Croix and its tributaries, in the present states of Wisconsin and Minnesota. The tract ceded also reached west to include the upper part of the basin of Rum River, and onward to the Mississippi between Sauk Rapids and the mouth of Crow Wing river. In September 1837, about twenty chiefs and braves of the Sioux went under direction of Governor Dodge, with the agent, Major Taliaferro, to the city of Washington and made a treaty ceding all their lands east of the Mississippi, together with the islands in this river. By these treaties a large tract of eastern Minnesota then a part of Wisconsin, including the sites of St. Paul and St. Anthony, was opened to white settlement. The county was named for Henry Dodge.

In 1853 government surveyors set lines for the townships. In 1854, two Mantor brothers and Eli P. Waterman established their claims in the area of present Mantorville. In early 1855, Dodge County was organized for local government.

On May 11, 1858, the Minnesota State Constitution placed Dodge County in the Fifth Judicial District . The county courthouse was constructed in 1865; it is presently the oldest still-used courthouse in Minnesota. As the 20th century began, emigrants from Germany, Sweden and Norway flowed to Minnesota in increasing numbers. Their influence added Catholic and Lutheran influence to the cultural mix.

During the late 1990s small independent farmers left or signed contracts with big Ag. Grazing livestock disappeared in factory farms. As time went on with increasing environmental impact from ever increasing hog CAFO´s fights over factory farms divided the town. Both farmers and academics have faced harrassement and retaliation for opposing Big Ag either in lawsuits or writing critically about agricultural pollution; some were pushed into resignation.

Soils of Dodge County

== Geography ==
The South Branch of the Middle Fork of the Zumbro River flows east-northeast through the upper central part of Dodge County. Salem Creek and Harkcom Creek drain the county to the east. The county terrain consists of rolling hills, devoted to agriculture where possible. The terrain slopes to the northeast; its highest point is on the eastern part of its southern border, at 1,352 ft (412 m) ASL. The county has a total area of 440 square miles (1,100 km^{2}), of which 439 square miles (1,140 km^{2}) is land and 0.3 square miles (0.78 km^{2}) (0.07%) is water.

Dodge County is in southeastern Minnesota and is 24 miles (39 km) long and 18 miles (29 km) wide. The central and northern parts are hilly and thickly wooded with pebbly, loose soil that allows for wheat agriculture. The southern part, in contrast, is flat and wet, more suited to grazing livestock. The soil is very fertile, with heavy black loam. Dodge is one of seven southern Minnesota counties that have no forest ecosystems; only prairie and savanna soils exist here.

Dodge County's sand and rock also make the area a center for building. Quarries in Mantorville were once enterprises and consist of layers of thick stone that can be cut into any desired shape. Wasioja is known for its "Wasioja stone."

=== Streams ===
- Dodge Center Creek
- Harkcom Creek
- Henslin Creek
- Little Cedar River
- Masten Creek
- Millikin Creek
- Salem Creek
- Tompkins Creek

=== Lakes ===
- Rice Lake (part)
- Zumbro River Reservoir

=== Major highways ===
- U.S. Highway 14
- U.S. Highway 218
- Minnesota State Highway 30
- Minnesota State Highway 56
- Minnesota State Highway 57

=== Airport ===
- Dodge Center Municipal Airport

=== Adjacent counties ===
- Rice County - northwest
- Goodhue County - northeast
- Olmsted County - east
- Mower County - south
- Steele County -west

== Demographics ==
Historical population
Census	Pop.	Note	%±
1860	3,797		—
1870	8,598		126.4%
1880	11,344		31.9%
1890	10,864		−4.2%
1900	13,340		22.8%
1910	12,094		−9.3%
1920	12,552		3.8%
1930	12,127		−3.4%
1940	12,931		6.6%
1950	12,624		−2.4%
1960	13,259		5.0%
1970	13,037		−1.7%
1980	14,773		13.3%
1990	15,731		6.5%
2000	17,731		12.7%
2010	20,087		13.3%
2020	20,867		3.9%
2025 (est.)	21,376	▲	2.4%
U.S. Decennial Census; 1790-1960 1900-1990; 1990-2000 2010-2020

=== 2020 census ===
As of the 2020 census, the county had a population of 20,867. The median age was 38.4 years. 26.5% of residents were under the age of 18 and 15.2% of residents were 65 years of age or older. For every 100 females there were 100.7 males, and for every 100 females age 18 and over there were 99.4 males age 18 and over.

The racial makeup of the county was 91.5% White, 0.6% Black or African American, 0.3% American Indian and Alaska Native, 0.5% Asian, <0.1% Native Hawaiian and Pacific Islander, 2.3% from some other race, and 4.7% from two or more races. Hispanic or Latino residents of any race comprised 5.1% of the population.

36.7% of residents lived in urban areas, while 63.3% lived in rural areas.

There were 7,903 households in the county, of which 35.1% had children under the age of 18 living in them. Of all households, 58.4% were married-couple households, 15.3% were households with a male householder and no spouse or partner present, and 18.5% were households with a female householder and no spouse or partner present. About 22.2% of all households were made up of individuals and 9.8% had someone living alone who was 65 years of age or older.

There were 8,291 housing units, of which 4.7% were vacant. Among occupied housing units, 84.4% were owner-occupied and 15.6% were renter-occupied. The homeowner vacancy rate was 0.8% and the rental vacancy rate was 5.4%.

=== Racial and ethnic composition ===
Dodge County, Minnesota – Racial and ethnic composition Note: the US Census treats Hispanic/Latino as an ethnic category. This table excludes Latinos from the racial categories and assigns them to a separate category. Hispanics/Latinos may be of any race.
Race / Ethnicity (NH = Non-Hispanic)	Pop 1980	Pop 1990	Pop 2000	Pop 2010	Pop 2020	% 1980	% 1990	% 2000	% 2010	% 2020
White alone (NH)	14,611	15,464	16,974	18,780	18,807	98.90%	98.30%	95.73%	93.49%	90.13%
Black or African American alone (NH)	10	11	35	59	126	0.07%	0.07%	0.20%	0.29%	0.60%
Native American or Alaska Native alone (NH)	22	28	31	38	37	0.15%	0.18%	0.17%	0.19%	0.18%
Asian alone (NH)	35	57	72	90	104	0.24%	0.36%	0.41%	0.45%	0.50%
Native Hawaiian or Pacific Islander alone (NH)	x	x	1	4	1	x	x	0.01%	0.02%	0.00%
Other race alone (NH)	5	7	3	9	65	0.03%	0.04%	0.02%	0.04%	0.31%
Mixed race or Multiracial (NH)	x	x	85	192	670	x	x	0.48%	0.96%	3.21%
Hispanic or Latino (any race)	90	164	530	915	1,057	0.61%	1.04%	2.99%	4.56%	5.07%
Total	14,773	15,731	17,731	20,087	20,867	100.00%	100.00%	100.00%	100.00%	100.00%

=== 2000 census ===
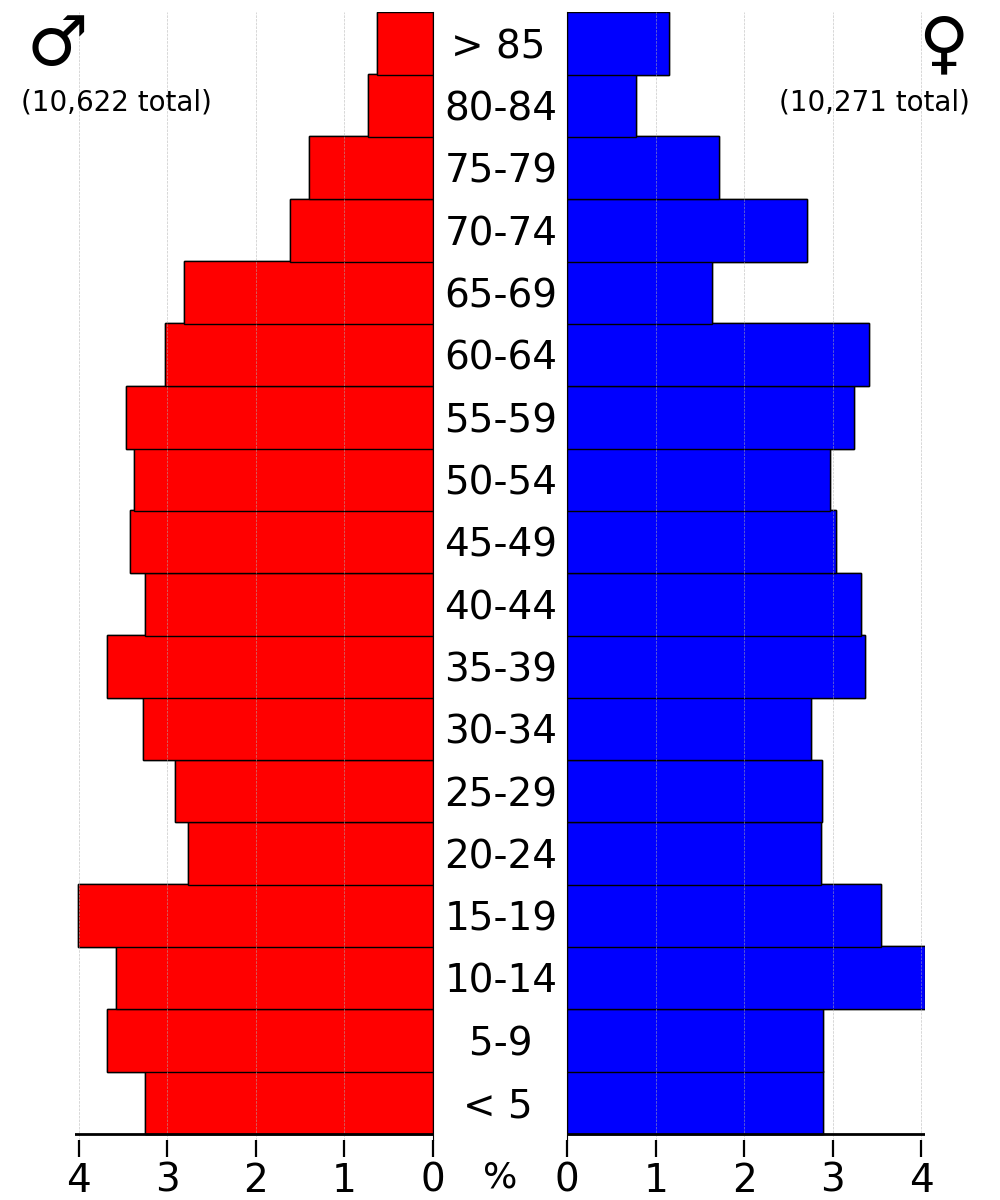
2022 US Census population pyramid for Dodge County, from ACS 5-year estimates

As of the census of 2000, there were 17,731 people, 6,420 households, and 4,853 families in the county. The population density was 40.4 per square mile (15.6/km^{2}). There were 6,642 housing units at an average density of 15.1 per square mile (5.8/km^{2}). The racial makeup of the county was 96.58% White, 0.20% Black or African American, 0.17% Native American, 0.41% Asian, 0.01% Pacific Islander, 1.89% from other races, and 0.73% from two or more races. 2.99% of the population were Hispanic or Latino of any race. 34.2% were of German, 26.9% Norwegian, 5.8% Irish, 5.8% American and 5.1% English ancestry.

There were 6,420 households, out of which 40.70% had children under the age of 18 living with them, 64.70% were married couples living together, 7.20% had a female householder with no husband present, and 24.40% were non-families. 20.20% of all households were made up of individuals, and 9.70% had someone living alone who was 65 years of age or older. The average household size was 2.73 and the average family size was 3.15.

The county population contained 30.20% under the age of 18, 7.60% from 18 to 24, 29.90% from 25 to 44, 20.20% from 45 to 64, and 12.10% who were 65 years of age or older. The median age was 35 years. For every 100 females, there were 98.80 males. For every 100 females age 18 and over, there were 97.90 males.

The median income for a household in the county was $47,437, and the median income for a family was $54,261. Males had a median income of $34,195 versus $25,903 for females. The per capita income for the county was $19,259. About 4.40% of families and 5.80% of the population were below the poverty line, including 5.80% of those under age 18 and 9.60% of those age 65 or over.

== Communities ==
=== Cities ===
- Blooming Prairie (partly in Steele County)
- Claremont
- Dodge Center
- Hayfield
- Kasson
- Mantorville (county seat)
- West Concord

=== Unincorporated communities ===
- Berne
- Concord
- Danesville (partial)
- Eden
- Oslo
- Rice Lake (ghost town)
- Wasioja

=== Townships ===
- Ashland Township
- Canisteo Township
- Claremont Township
- Concord Township
- Ellington Township
- Hayfield Township
- Mantorville Township
- Milton Township
- Ripley Township
- Vernon Township
- Wasioja Township
- Westfield Township

== Politics ==
Dodge County voters have been reliably Republican Party (United States) for decades. The only instance since 1964 (as of 2024) of Dodge County voting for the Democratic Party (United States) was when Bill Clinton carried the county in 1996.

United States presidential election results for Dodge County, Minnesota
Year	Republican		Democratic		Third party(ies)	
Year	No.	%	No.	%	No.	%
1892	1,219	55.33%	536	24.33%	448	20.34%
1896	1,900	65.09%	911	31.21%	108	3.70%
1900	1,611	65.06%	674	27.22%	191	7.71%
1904	1,499	75.86%	319	16.14%	158	8.00%
1908	1,454	69.77%	515	24.71%	115	5.52%
1912	470	23.35%	543	26.97%	1,000	49.68%
1916	1,260	55.80%	895	39.64%	103	4.56%
1920	3,386	83.40%	516	12.71%	158	3.89%
1924	2,856	65.97%	215	4.97%	1,258	29.06%
1928	3,569	74.49%	1,196	24.96%	26	0.54%
1932	2,129	43.53%	2,675	54.69%	87	1.78%
1936	2,138	41.61%	2,812	54.73%	188	3.66%
1940	3,257	57.90%	2,357	41.90%	11	0.20%
1944	2,902	61.42%	1,808	38.26%	15	0.32%
1948	2,381	47.99%	2,523	50.86%	57	1.15%
1952	3,893	70.68%	1,582	28.72%	33	0.60%
1956	3,205	63.78%	1,814	36.10%	6	0.12%
1960	3,769	63.42%	2,170	36.51%	4	0.07%
1964	2,474	44.02%	3,138	55.84%	8	0.14%
1968	3,064	53.67%	2,437	42.69%	208	3.64%
1972	3,863	65.08%	1,921	32.36%	152	2.56%
1976	3,446	52.23%	3,009	45.60%	143	2.17%
1980	3,900	54.93%	2,698	38.00%	502	7.07%
1984	4,428	60.97%	2,786	38.36%	48	0.66%
1988	3,848	56.21%	2,925	42.73%	73	1.07%
1992	3,049	38.25%	2,620	32.87%	2,303	28.89%
1996	2,888	38.84%	3,233	43.48%	1,314	17.67%
2000	4,213	52.34%	3,370	41.86%	467	5.80%
2004	5,593	56.68%	4,117	41.72%	158	1.60%
2008	5,468	53.54%	4,463	43.70%	282	2.76%
2012	5,522	53.47%	4,487	43.45%	318	3.08%
2016	6,527	61.26%	3,102	29.12%	1,025	9.62%
2020	7,783	63.86%	4,079	33.47%	325	2.67%
2024	8,095	64.84%	4,108	32.91%	281	2.25%

== See also ==
- National Register of Historic Places listings in Dodge County, Minnesota
