= Ellington Township, Dodge County, Minnesota =

Ellington Township, Minnesota
- Township
- Location within the state of Minnesota Ellington Township, Minnesota (the United States)
- Coordinates: 44°9′28″N 92°59′37″W
- Country: United States
- State: Minnesota
- County: Dodge

Area
  - Total: 36.0 sq mi (93.3 km^{2})
  - Land: 36.0 sq mi (93.3 km^{2})
  - Water: 0 sq mi (0.0 km^{2})
- Elevation: 1,243 ft (379 m)

Population (2000)
  - Total: 278
  - Density: 7.8/sq mi (3/km^{2})
- Time zone: UTC-6 (Central (CST))
  - Summer (DST): UTC-5 (CDT)
- FIPS code: 27-18764
- GNIS feature ID: 0664074

Ellington Township is a township in Dodge County, Minnesota, United States. The population was 278 at the 2000 census.

Ellington Township was organized in 1858, and named after Ellington, Connecticut.

== Geography ==
According to the United States Census Bureau, the township has a total area of 36.0 square miles (93 km^{2}), all land.

== Demographics ==
As of the census of 2000, there were 278 people, 105 households, and 76 families residing in the township. The population density was 7.7 inhabitants per square mile (3.0/km^{2}). There were 110 housing units at an average density of 3.1 per square mile (1.2/km^{2}). The racial makeup of the township was 97.84% White, 0.36% Native American, 0.36% Asian, 0.72% from other races, and 0.72% from two or more races. Hispanic or Latino of any race were 1.44% of the population.

There were 105 households, out of which 37.1% had children under the age of 18 living with them, 67.6% were married couples living together, 1.9% had a female householder with no husband present, and 26.7% were non-families. 22.9% of all households were made up of individuals, and 14.3% had someone living alone who was 65 years of age or older. The average household size was 2.65 and the average family size was 3.10.

In the township the population was spread out, with 29.9% under the age of 18, 5.0% from 18 to 24, 27.7% from 25 to 44, 19.4% from 45 to 64, and 18.0% who were 65 years of age or older. The median age was 38 years. For every 100 females, there were 93.1 males. For every 100 females age 18 and over, there were 103.1 males.

The median income for a household in the township was $45,208, and the median income for a family was $55,625. Males had a median income of $32,500 versus $27,813 for females. The per capita income for the township was $17,594. About 5.1% of families and 5.7% of the population were below the poverty line, including 2.2% of those under the age of eighteen and 18.2% of those 65 or over.
