= Claremont, Minnesota =

City in Minnesota, United States

Claremont
- City
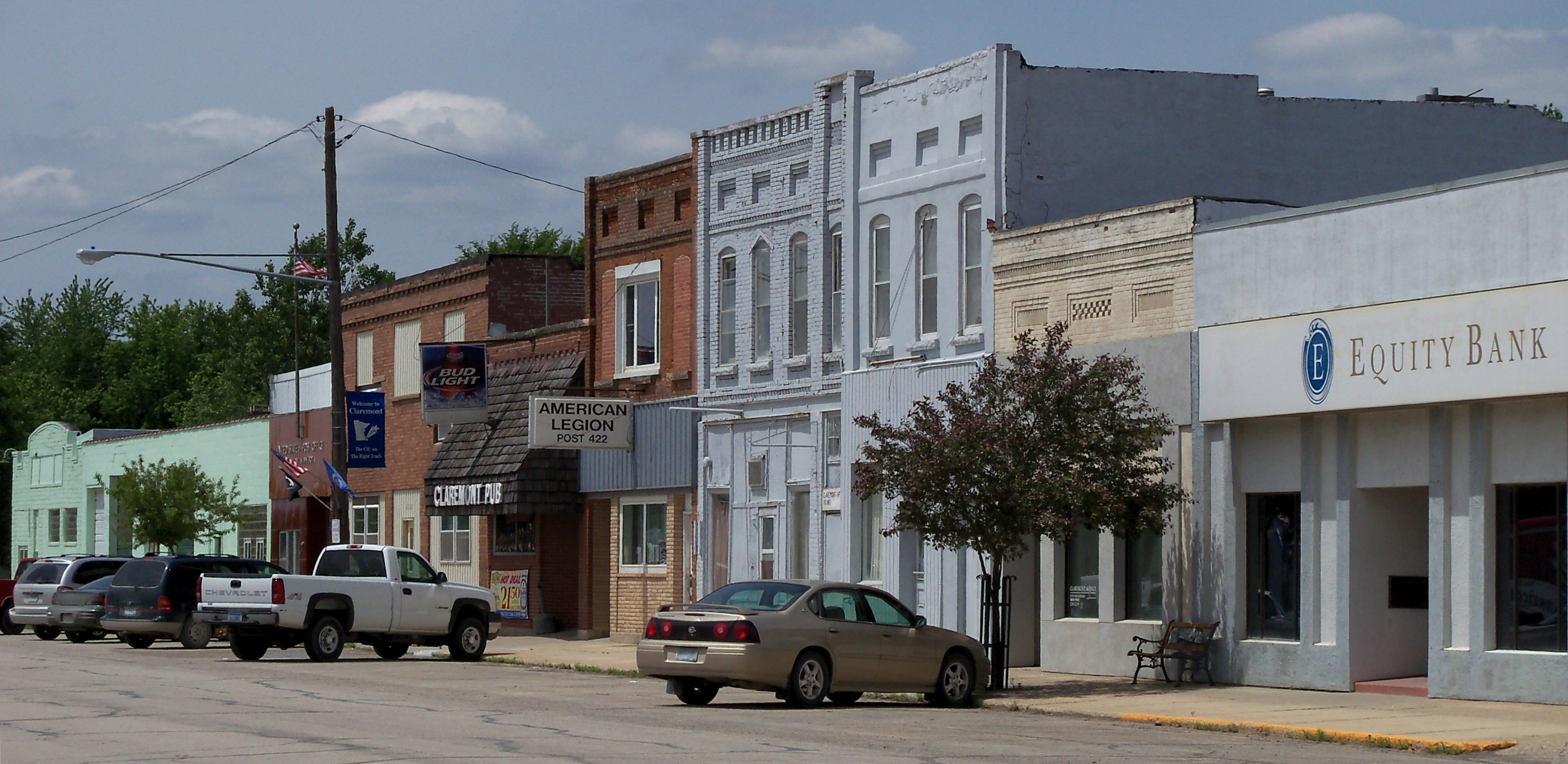
- Buildings in downtown Claremont
- Motto: "City On The Right Track"
- Location of Claremont within Dodge County and state of Minnesota
- Coordinates: 44°02′42″N 92°59′54″W
- Country: United States
- State: Minnesota
- County: Dodge
- Incorporated: 1878

Government
  - Type: Mayor–Council
  - Mayor: Tasha Dahl
  - City Council Members: Ryan Hedberg, Deborah Ellis, Jacob Klejeski, Krystal Sultze

Area
  - Total: 1.08 sq mi (2.79 km^{2})
  - Land: 1.08 sq mi (2.79 km^{2})
  - Water: 0 sq mi (0.00 km^{2})
- Elevation: 1,286 ft (392 m)

Population (2020)
  - Total: 513
  - Density: 476.1/sq mi (183.84/km^{2})
- Time zone: UTC-6 (Central (CST))
  - Summer (DST): UTC-5 (CDT)
- ZIP code: 55924
- Area code: 507
- FIPS code: 27-11566
- GNIS feature ID: 2393531
- Website: www.claremontmn.com

Claremont is a city in Dodge County, Minnesota, United States. Located along U.S. Highway 14, Claremont lies in southeastern Minnesota and is part of the Rochester metropolitan area. The city had a population of 513 according to the 2020 census.

Founded in the mid-19th century, Claremont developed as a small agricultural hub, with its growth spurred by the arrival of the Chicago & North Western Railway. The city was incorporated in 1878 and has historically served the surrounding farming community, maintaining a modest population throughout its history. In 1990, Claremont’s school district merged with neighboring districts in Dodge Center and West Concord, forming the Triton Public Schools district. Today, Claremont retains its small-town character while offering essential services to residents and the surrounding rural area.

== Geography ==
Claremont is a small city in Dodge County, located in southeastern Minnesota. It is part of the Rochester metropolitan area. The city is situated along U.S. Route 14, approximately 18 miles from Rochester, the largest city in the area. Claremont is easily accessible via Dodge County Road 1 and Dodge County Road 3, which connect it to the larger regional road network.

=== Location and Size ===
Claremont covers a total land area of 1.08 square miles (2.80 km^{2}), as reported by the United States Census Bureau. This is a relatively small land area compared to major U.S. cities, which tend to range in hundreds of square miles. For comparison, the city of Minneapolis in Minnesota spans about 58.4 square miles (151 km^{2}), making Claremont much smaller in land area.

=== Location in Relation to Neighboring Areas ===
Claremont is located in Dodge County, with neighboring cities and towns including Dodge Center to the east and West Concord to the northeast. The city lies about 30 miles west of Rochester, which is known for its healthcare and educational industries. The city is situated within the Rochester metropolitan area, but it retains a rural, small-town character.

=== Physical Features ===
Claremont is part of the Minnesota Prairie and the driftless area of southeastern Minnesota. The city is primarily situated on flat to gently rolling terrain, typical of much of the southeastern Minnesota region. The city is surrounded by farmland, with some small hills and scattered wooded areas.

=== Waterways and Ports ===
While Claremont is not directly located on any major waterways, it is situated in an area with access to various rivers and streams in Dodge County, most notably the Zumbro River, which flows to the east. The Zumbro River provides some opportunities for local water activities, but Claremont itself does not have large-scale ports or navigable waterways.

=== Topography ===
The elevation of Claremont is approximately 1,286 feet (392 m) (392 meters) above sea level. The landscape in and around Claremont consists of relatively flat farmland and gentle hills, with small streams running through the area.

=== Natural Resources ===
The region around Claremont is rich in agricultural resources, including fertile soil ideal for farming. The Minnesota Prairie area supports a variety of crops, including corn, soybeans, and wheat, as well as livestock farming. Other natural resources in the area are primarily agricultural products rather than mineral resources.

=== Road and Rail Networks ===
Claremont benefits from a well-developed road network that connects the city to larger metropolitan areas:

- U.S. Highway 14 is the primary route that connects Claremont to Rochester and other nearby towns.
- Dodge County Road 1 and Dodge County Road 3 provide additional local access to surrounding areas. These roads are locally maintained by the Dodge County Highway Department.

While Claremont itself no longer has a rail line, the area was historically served by the Chicago & North Western Railway, which helped to establish the city’s agricultural trading importance in the late 19th century. Rail access was crucial for the region’s economic development during that time.

=== Climate ===
Claremont has a humid continental climate, characterized by four distinct seasons:

- Winters are cold, with average temperatures often dropping below freezing, and snowfall is common.
- Summers are warm and humid, with temperatures frequently reaching the 80s and 90s °F (27-37 °C).
- Spring and fall are transitional seasons, with mild temperatures and moderate rainfall.

Seasonal temperature fluctuations can be significant, with summer highs occasionally reaching over 90 °F (32 °C), while winter lows can dip below 0 °F (-18 °C). Precipitation is spread throughout the year, with spring and summer seeing the most rainfall. Atmospheric pressure is typical for the region, with some variability based on seasonal changes. Humidity levels are high during summer months and lower during the winter months.

=== Seasonal Abnormalities ===
- Summer thunderstorms can bring heavy rain and occasional tornadoes to the region. The area is located in Tornado Alley, so Claremont may experience tornado warnings during the summer months.
- Snowfall can be significant in winter, especially from November to March, with accumulation averaging around 30 inches (762.0 mm) (76 cm) annually.
- Drought conditions can sometimes affect the area, although the climate generally provides adequate rainfall for agriculture.

=== Political Geography ===
Claremont is situated within Dodge County, which is part of the Rochester metropolitan area. The city of Rochester, located approximately 18 miles northeast, serves as the regional center for healthcare, education, and industry.

Claremont is part of Minnesota Senate District 26 and House District 26B, both of which encompass other small towns and rural areas in southeastern Minnesota. The city is governed by a Mayor-Council system with the Mayor and City Council overseeing local policies.

=== State of Industrial Development ===
While Claremont is primarily a rural agricultural community, it benefits from the nearby Rochester metropolitan area, which is a hub of healthcare and biotechnology. The presence of the Mayo Clinic in Rochester provides significant economic benefits to surrounding areas, including Claremont. The local economy is supported by manufacturing, healthcare, and construction, with small-scale industrial activities and businesses contributing to the local economy.

== History ==
=== Development of the Area ===
Claremont, located in southeastern Minnesota, was established in the mid-19th century. Its development was initially influenced by the area’s rich agricultural potential and its proximity to major transportation routes, including railroads and highways. The Chicago and North Western Railway played a crucial role in Claremont's early economic development, helping to establish the city as a hub for agricultural trade. The city's incorporation in 1878 formalized its role in the region, and it grew steadily as a small agricultural community, serving the surrounding farming population.

=== Influence Exerted by Major Powers in Development ===
The influence of major powers in Claremont’s development primarily came from the federal and state governments, which provided infrastructure, such as roads and railways, that facilitated the city’s growth. The Chicago and North Western Railway’s expansion across the Midwest further linked Claremont to regional markets, boosting its economy. The railroad era also helped shape the city’s early settlement patterns and economic structure. The broader agricultural policies of Minnesota also influenced the region, encouraging farming and rural development in the area.

=== Divisions or Partitions Resulting from Wars and Treaties ===
Claremont's history has not been significantly shaped by wars or treaties. The area was originally inhabited by Indigenous peoples before being settled by European Americans in the mid-19th century. There are no specific historical records indicating significant partitions or divisions of the land due to wars or treaties, though the broader history of the United States’ westward expansion and settlement affected the development of communities like Claremont.

=== Major Geographic or Political Factors to the Current Status of the Area ===
The major geographic factors that have influenced Claremont’s development are its location within the Minnesota Prairie and southeastern Minnesota's relatively flat and gently rolling terrain. The city is situated near the Zumbro River, which provides access to water resources, but it is not located directly on any major waterways or ports. Politically, Claremont is part of Dodge County, which provides governance and public services, while the city itself operates under a mayor-council system. The nearby city of Rochester, known for its healthcare and educational industries, has provided an economic and population draw for the area, influencing the city’s status and development.

=== Present Form of Government and Previous Forms of Government ===
Claremont currently operates under a mayor-council system, with an elected mayor and city council members overseeing local governance. The city was incorporated in 1878, and since that time, it has retained a small-town, locally-driven governance structure. While Claremont has always had an organized municipal government, the form has remained relatively unchanged over time. Prior to its incorporation, the town was governed by a combination of territorial and county oversight, typical of settlements in early Minnesota.

=== Extent of Political Control Over Other Areas ===
Claremont's political control is confined to its own city limits and does not extend to neighboring municipalities or counties. It is part of the broader governance structure of Dodge County, which provides certain services and oversight for the region. The city's government works alongside the county’s government to address broader issues such as regional transportation, infrastructure, and land-use policies, but Claremont has no formal control over adjacent areas.

=== Degree of Control Over the Population Exercised by Government ===
Claremont’s local government exercises a moderate degree of control over its population, largely through municipal ordinances, zoning regulations, and local law enforcement. The city has the authority to regulate land use, manage public infrastructure, and enact policies related to public safety, health, and welfare. However, because of its small size, Claremont’s governance is relatively minimal in its scope compared to larger urban areas.

=== Susceptibility of Existing Government Toward Major Powers ===
As a small town, Claremont’s government is subject to the influence of state and federal authorities, particularly in areas such as law enforcement, transportation, and economic policy. While the city exercises local governance, it is also subject to broader state-level regulations and federal policies that impact its development and services. The influence of larger powers like the state government of Minnesota and federal agencies is particularly felt in areas such as funding for infrastructure and education, where Claremont relies on state and federal support.

=== Political Organization of the Area ===
Claremont is situated within the political structure of Dodge County, which is governed by a five-member board of commissioners. The city is part of Minnesota’s Senate District 26 and House District 26B, which include other small towns and rural areas in southeastern Minnesota. Claremont’s mayor-council system provides local governance, while county and state governments oversee larger regional matters. The city’s governance is directly influenced by both local citizens and the broader political framework of Minnesota and the United States.

== People ==
=== Demographics ===
Claremont, Minnesota has experienced a fluctuating population over the past 100 years, showing periods of growth and decline, typical of many rural Midwestern towns. The population peaked in 2000 at 620 residents, but since then, it has seen a gradual decline, reaching 513 in 2020. The town’s demographic trends reflect broader shifts in rural America, including an aging population and a growing number of non-family and single-person households. Additionally, Claremont has seen an increase in racial diversity, particularly among Hispanic or Latino residents, although it remains predominantly White.

==== Census Trends over the Last 100 Years ====
Historical population
Census	Pop.	Note	%±
1880	269		—
1900	317		—
1910	275		−13.2%
1920	334		21.5%
1930	373		11.7%
1940	398		6.7%
1950	426		7.0%
1960	466		9.4%
1970	520		11.6%
1980	591		13.7%
1990	530		−10.3%
2000	620		17.0%
2010	548		−11.6%
2020	513		−6.4%
U.S. Decennial Census

Claremont’s population growth was strongest in the mid-20th century, especially from the 1940s to 1970s. Since 2000, the town has seen a slight population decrease, mirroring the trend of population decline in many rural communities across the United States.

==== 2020 Census ====
The most recent U.S. Census data from 2020 reported the following for Claremont:

- Total population: 513
- Number of households: 218
- Number of families: 126
- Population density: 476.32 people per square mile
- Housing units: 252 with an average density of 233.33 per square mile

The racial composition of the city was as follows:

- White: 91.8%
- African American: 0.6%
- Asian: 0.8%
- Other races: 5.4%
- Two or more races: 1.4%
- Hispanic or Latino (of any race): 14.2%

==== Household Composition ====
- 34.9% of households had children under 18
- 39.4% were married couples living together
- 11.5% had a female householder with no husband present
- 6.0% had a male householder with no wife present
- 42.2% were non-families
- 33.9% of households consisted of individuals, with 9.2% having someone 65 or older living alone

The average household size was 2.35, and the average family size was 3.05.

==== Age Distribution ====
The median age of Claremont’s population in 2020 was 34.8 years. Age distribution included:

- 28.5% under 18
- 4.2% aged 18–24
- 31.0% aged 25–44
- 25.4% aged 45–64
- 10.9% aged 65 or older

The gender composition of the city was 54.7% male and 45.3% female.

==== Birth and Death Rates ====
Current vital statistics on birth and death rates for Claremont are not immediately available from the census data itself, as these figures are generally provided by state and local health departments or specific studies on demographics. However, based on the trends observed over several decades, Claremont follows the general pattern of rural Minnesota, which often sees slower growth and lower birth rates, as well as an aging population leading to higher death rates.

For further detailed birth and death rate data, it is typically necessary to consult local public health records or specific demographic studies provided by agencies such as the [Minnesota Department of Health](https://www.health.state.mn.us/) or the [U.S. Centers for Disease Control and Prevention](https://www.cdc.gov/).

==== Current Population Distribution and Density ====
As of the 2020 Census, Claremont had a population density of 476.32 people per square mile. This figure is on the higher end for rural communities in southeastern Minnesota, though still much lower than urban areas. The city spans a land area of 1.08 square miles, and with a population of 513, it maintains a small-town atmosphere while being located near the larger urban area of Rochester. Claremont's population density is reflective of a stable, if slightly shrinking, rural community, with a balanced distribution of family and non-family households.

=== Culture and Social Structure ===
==== History, Government, and Geography as They Affect the Cultural Makeup of the People ====
Claremont’s culture is deeply influenced by its rural location, agricultural roots, and historical development as a small Midwestern town. The city has evolved from a primarily farming community to one that now benefits from its proximity to Rochester, which offers access to healthcare, education, and employment opportunities. These geographical and economic shifts have brought about a more diverse population and a gradual movement away from its agricultural roots, though farming remains important.

The government structure, with its Mayor-Council system, supports local community life, with a focus on maintaining a small-town atmosphere while adapting to external pressures from nearby metropolitan areas. Local events and community gatherings still play a significant role in Claremont’s social structure, as residents continue to engage in town meetings and volunteer for local causes.

The local culture has been shaped by the predominant religious beliefs in the area, with many residents belonging to the Church of Jesus Christ of Latter-day Saints, which has a significant influence on social life and values. Community traditions, such as local fairs and seasonal events, reflect the town’s agricultural heritage.

==== Heroes and Leaders of Groups, with Reasons for Special Esteem ====
Prominent figures in Claremont’s history include local leaders who have contributed to the city’s development and sense of community. The town has been shaped by civic-minded individuals, such as past mayors, council members, and community organizers, who have worked to improve local infrastructure, create public services, and strengthen the town’s economy. The presence of local heroes, including those involved in military service and civil rights efforts, continues to be celebrated by the community through public recognition and events.

==== Ethnic Groups and Population Distribution ====
Claremont has a predominantly White population, though Hispanic or Latino residents represent a notable minority. This reflects broader demographic shifts in the region, where rural areas have seen increasing diversity over the years. The 2020 census indicates that 14.2% of the population identifies as Hispanic or Latino, marking a significant, though still minority, proportion of the population. The racial makeup of the city also includes small percentages of African American and Asian residents.

Claremont remains a rural town, and the distribution of people largely reflects a smaller, agricultural-focused economy. The town's population is distributed across a wide range of ages, with a significant portion under 18, reflecting an ongoing support for young families, while the aging population is also growing.

==== Majority or Minority Groups ====
The majority ethnic group in Claremont is White, though there is a growing representation of Hispanic or Latino residents. As in many rural communities

== Economy ==
The economy of Claremont is primarily supported by key industries, including health care and social assistance, manufacturing, and construction. As of recent data, health care employs the largest number of residents, with around 39 individuals working in various roles within this sector. Manufacturing provides employment to approximately 36 residents, while construction employs around 23 people.

The median household income in Claremont is estimated at $72,000, slightly below the state median, and the per capita income is $26,758. Approximately 19.7% of the population lives below the poverty line, which is higher than the state average.

The Claremont Economic Development Authority (EDA) actively supports local businesses and aims to attract new enterprises. The EDA offers a Façade Improvement Program, providing matching grants of up to $2,500 to enhance downtown aesthetics, and a Revolving Loan Program that offers low-interest loans to small and medium-sized businesses.

Claremont’s economy, while modest, plays an essential role in supporting the surrounding agricultural and rural community through these local programs and steady employment in its core sectors.

== Homesteading and Housing Opportunities ==
Claremont, Minnesota, has a history of offering land incentives to encourage settlement and growth. While no active homesteading program is in place as of 2024, the city previously offered free land to eligible individuals under income qualifications to stimulate development.

In 2014, Claremont launched an initiative offering free residential lots to those willing to build homes, requiring a $1,000 administrative fee. However, despite these efforts, the program saw no participants.

In 2021, the city reintroduced similar efforts, offering land to households meeting specific income criteria. Again, these lots remained unclaimed.

Additionally, Claremont has partnered with Arden Home Services to offer affordable housing solutions. The city currently provides homes to low- to moderate-income working families, supporting the purchase of homes through USDA mortgages. Further information can be found on the city’s website.

== Education ==
Historically, Claremont, Minnesota, operated its own school district, with Claremont High School proudly sporting the Parrot as its mascot. The school's colors were orange and black, and it served the community’s educational needs until the district reorganization in 1990. In that year, Claremont's school district consolidated with the neighboring districts of Dodge Center and West Concord, forming the Triton Public Schools district. This merger aimed to centralize resources and expand educational opportunities for students across the communities.

The newly established Triton district is headquartered in Dodge Center, which now houses the district’s three main schools:

- Triton Elementary School: Serving grades K–5, focused on foundational education and personal development.
- Triton Middle School: Serving grades 6–8, where students transition into more advanced academics and extracurricular activities.
- Triton Senior High School: Covering grades 9–12, offering a comprehensive curriculum and competitive athletics.

The Triton mascot, the Cobra, represents the combined district, and the school colors are maroon and gray. The district’s first commencement exercises were held in 1991, and that year also marked the inaugural publication of the "Triton Tradition" yearbook.

=== Athletics and Notable Achievements ===
Triton High School has a strong athletic tradition, particularly in football. Under the leadership of Coach Don Henderson, Triton won the Minnesota State Football Championships in 1994 (B Division), 2000 (AA Division), and 2006 (AA Division). The 2006 team set a Minnesota State High School League Prep Bowl record for the highest score in a championship game (70 points) and for total combined points in a game (91 points).

Today, Triton Public Schools continues to serve the communities of Claremont, Dodge Center, and West Concord, fostering educational and athletic excellence within a unified district.
