= Masten Creek =

Stream in Dodge County, Minnesota, U.S.

Coordinates: 44°03′46″N 92°44′03″W

Masten Creek is a stream in Dodge County, in the U.S. state of Minnesota.

Masten Creek (formerly Maston's branch) was named for an early settler.

== See also ==
- List of rivers of Minnesota
