= Harkcom Creek =

Stream in Minnesota, United States

Details
- Location: Minnesota, United States
- Coordinates: 44°10′34″N 92°40′29″W

Harkcom Creek is a stream in the U.S. state of Minnesota.

Harkcom Creek was named for an early settler.

== See also ==
- List of rivers of Minnesota
