= Westfield Township, Dodge County, Minnesota =

Westfield Township, Minnesota
- Township
- Location within the state of Minnesota Westfield Township, Minnesota (the United States)
- Coordinates: 43°53′26″N 92°59′15″W
- Country: United States
- State: Minnesota
- County: Dodge

Area
  - Total: 36.2 sq mi (93.7 km^{2})
  - Land: 36.2 sq mi (93.7 km^{2})
  - Water: 0 sq mi (0.0 km^{2})
- Elevation: 1,266 ft (386 m)

Population (2000)
  - Total: 421
  - Density: 12/sq mi (4.5/km^{2})
- Time zone: UTC-6 (Central (CST))
  - Summer (DST): UTC-5 (CDT)
- FIPS code: 27-69448
- GNIS feature ID: 0665963

Westfield Township is a township in Dodge County, Minnesota, United States. The population was 421 at the 2000 census.

Westfield Township was organized in 1866.

== Geography ==
According to the United States Census Bureau, the township has a total area of 36.2 square miles (93.7 km^{2}), all land.

== Demographics ==
As of the census of 2000, there were 421 people, 151 households, and 125 families residing in the township. The population density was 11.6 people per square mile (4.5/km^{2}). There were 157 housing units at an average density of 4.3/sq mi (1.7/km^{2}). The racial makeup of the township was 98.34% White, 0.95% African American, 0.48% from other races, and 0.24% from two or more races. Hispanic or Latino of any race were 1.43% of the population.

There were 151 households, out of which 38.4% had children under the age of 18 living with them, 80.1% were married couples living together, 1.3% had a female householder with no husband present, and 16.6% were non-families. 11.9% of all households were made up of individuals, and 4.6% had someone living alone who was 65 years of age or older. The average household size was 2.79 and the average family size was 3.06.

In the township the population was spread out, with 28.5% under the age of 18, 4.8% from 18 to 24, 29.2% from 25 to 44, 26.6% from 45 to 64, and 10.9% who were 65 years of age or older. The median age was 39 years. For every 100 females, there were 106.4 males. For every 100 females age 18 and over, there were 110.5 males.

The median income for a household in the township was $48,333, and the median income for a family was $55,313. Males had a median income of $32,167 versus $24,750 for females. The per capita income for the township was $18,807. About 4.8% of families and 5.6% of the population were below the poverty line, including 5.2% of those under age 18 and 14.0% of those age 65 or over.
