= Wasioja, Minnesota =

Unincorporated community in Minnesota, United States

Wasioja
- Unincorporated community
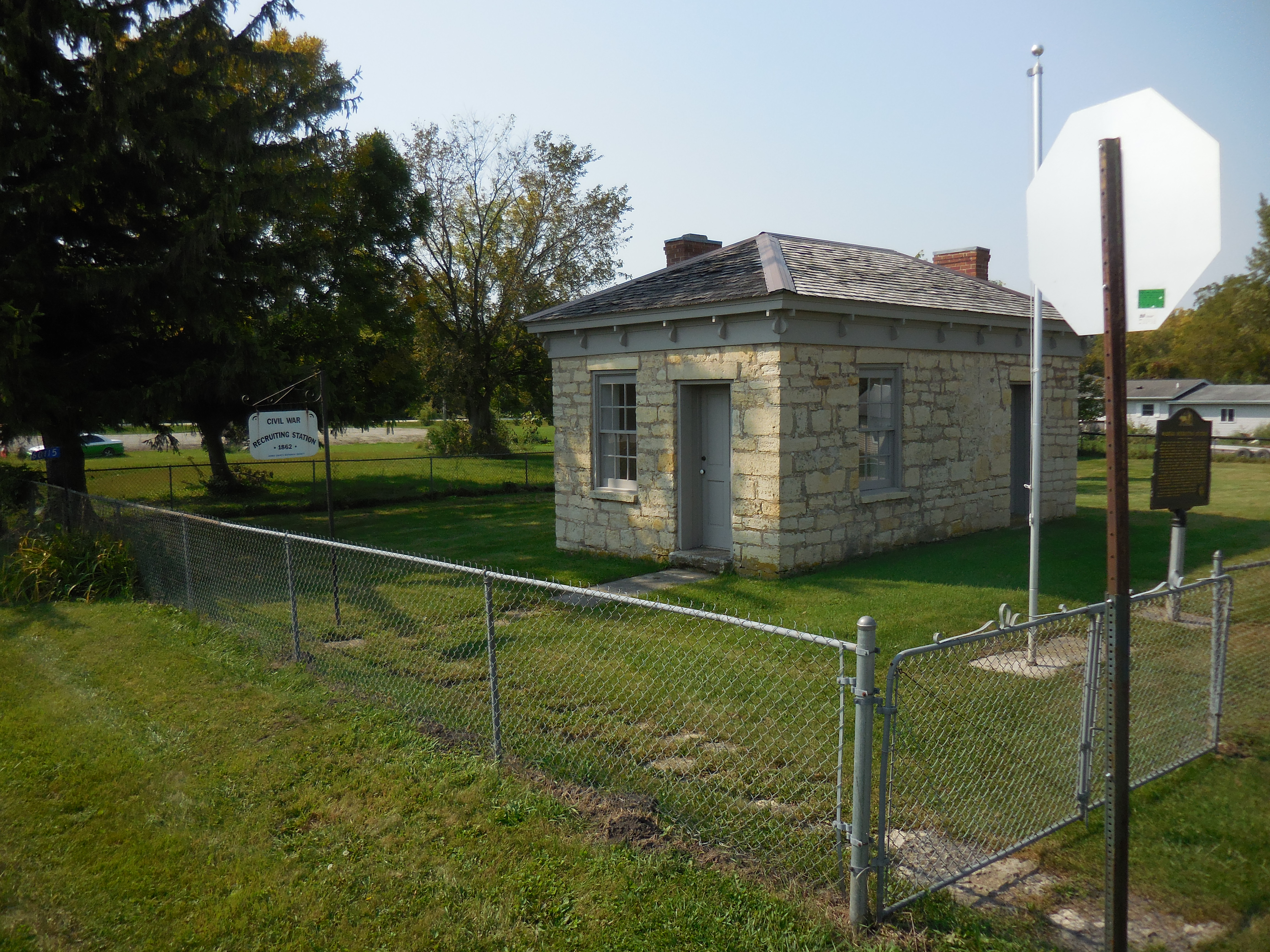
- The Civil War recruiting station in Wasioja

- Location within Minnesota Location within the United States
- Coordinates: 44°04′49″N 92°49′10″W
- Country: United States
- State: Minnesota
- County: Dodge
- Township: Wasioja Township
- Elevation: 1,168 ft (356 m)
- Time zone: UTC-6 (Central (CST))
  - Summer (DST): UTC-5 (CDT)
- ZIP code: 55927
- Area code: 507
- GNIS feature ID: 653827

Wasioja is an unincorporated community in Wasioja Township, Dodge County, Minnesota, United States. The community is located near the junction of Dodge County Roads 9 and 16. The South Branch Middle Fork of the Zumbro River and Dodge Center Creek meet at Wasioja. Nearby places include Dodge Center, Mantorville, and Kasson.

Historical population
Census	Pop.	Note	%±
1860	200		—
1870	324		62.0%
U.S. Decennial Census

== History ==
Wasioja was settled in 1854 and platted in 1856. A post office was established at Wasioja in 1856, and remained in operation until 1911. Wasioja is derived from the native Dakota-language name for the Zumbro River - Ważí Ożú Wakpá, meaning the "pine grove" river. By 1860, the community's population had reached 1,000, its economy driven by limestone quarries, lumber, and agriculture. In 1860 the Minnesota Seminary was opened on the outskirts of town.

The town's fortunes were ruined by three separate events that led to its abandonment by most of its population. Its male population was decimated by the American Civil War, it was bypassed by the railroad in 1866, in favor of a southern route, and it failed to become the county seat of Dodge County. By 1870 the population had declined to 800.

== Historic district ==
Most of the community is contained within the bounds of a historic district, listed on the National Register of Historic Places in 1975. Historically significant buildings include the Wasioja Baptist Church, Wasioja School, a Civil War recruiting station, and the stone Andrew Doig House. Also of historic significance are the ruins of the seminary, now a local park, and the limestone quarries on the outskirts of town.

== See also ==
- National Register of Historic Places listings in Dodge County, Minnesota
