= Vernon Township, Dodge County, Minnesota =

Vernon Township, Minnesota
- Township
- Location within the state of Minnesota Vernon Township, Minnesota (the United States)
- Coordinates: 43°53′7″N 92°43′43″W
- Country: United States
- State: Minnesota
- County: Dodge

Area
  - Total: 36.2 sq mi (93.8 km^{2})
  - Land: 36.2 sq mi (93.8 km^{2})
  - Water: 0 sq mi (0.0 km^{2})
- Elevation: 1,263 ft (385 m)

Population (2000)
  - Total: 567
  - Density: 16/sq mi (6/km^{2})
- Time zone: UTC-6 (Central (CST))
  - Summer (DST): UTC-5 (CDT)
- FIPS code: 27-66892
- GNIS feature ID: 0665862

Vernon Township is a township in Dodge County, Minnesota, United States. The population was 567 at the 2000 census.

Vernon Township was organized in 1858, and named after Mount Vernon, the estate of George Washington.

== Geography ==
According to the United States Census Bureau, the township has a total area of 36.2 square miles (93.8 km^{2}), all land.

== Demographics ==
As of the census of 2000, there were 567 people, 210 households, and 165 families residing in the township. The population density was 15.7 people per square mile (6.0/km^{2}). There were 217 housing units at an average density of 6.0/sq mi (2.3/km^{2}). The racial makeup of the township was 99.65% White, 0.18% Native American and 0.18% Pacific Islander.

There were 210 households, out of which 34.8% had children under the age of 18 living with them, 73.3% were married couples living together, 1.9% had a female householder with no husband present, and 21.4% were non-families. 19.5% of all households were made up of individuals, and 7.6% had someone living alone who was 65 years of age or older. The average household size was 2.70 and the average family size was 3.11.

In the township the population was spread out, with 26.6% under the age of 18, 6.3% from 18 to 24, 28.7% from 25 to 44, 27.2% from 45 to 64, and 11.1% who were 65 years of age or older. The median age was 39 years. For every 100 females, there were 103.2 males. For every 100 females age 18 and over, there were 109.0 males.

The median income for a household in the township was $56,042, and the median income for a family was $62,083. Males had a median income of $32,109 versus $29,500 for females. The per capita income for the township was $21,206. About 1.2% of families and 1.7% of the population were below the poverty line, including none of those under age 18 and 3.1% of those age 65 or over.
