= Hayfield, Minnesota =

City in Minnesota, United States

Hayfield
- City
- Motto: "Where people make progress"
- Location of Hayfield, Minnesota
- Coordinates: 43°53′25″N 92°50′49″W
- Country: United States
- State: Minnesota
- County: Dodge

Government
  - Type: City
  - Mayor: Rich Fjersted
  - City Clerk: Lori Kindschy

Area
  - Total: 1.25 sq mi (3.24 km^{2})
  - Land: 1.25 sq mi (3.24 km^{2})
  - Water: 0 sq mi (0.00 km^{2})
- Elevation: 1,319 ft (402 m)

Population (2020)
  - Total: 1,364
  - Density: 1,089.9/sq mi (420.81/km^{2})
- Time zone: UTC-6 (Central (CST))
  - Summer (DST): UTC-5 (CDT)
- ZIP code: 55940
- Area code: 507
- FIPS code: 27-27872
- GNIS feature ID: 2394334
- Website: www.hayfieldmn.com

Hayfield is a city in Dodge County, Minnesota, United States. As of the 2020 census, Hayfield had a population of 1,364.

== History ==
The Hayfield branch of the U.S. Post Office has been in operation since 1885. Hayfield was incorporated in 1896. Hayfield Township was organized March 30, 1872, having previously been a part of Vernon. Its name was adopted from a township of Crawford County in northwestern Pennsylvania. The city of Hayfield, sections 15 and 22, was incorporated January 7, 1896; it had a station of the Chicago Great Western Railroad; the Vernon Co-operative Creamery near Hayfield was the oldest farmer-owned creamery in the state.

== Geography ==
According to the United States Census Bureau, the city has a total area of 1.27 square miles (3.29 km^{2}), all land.

== Transportation ==
Minnesota State Highways 30 and 56 are the two highways running through the community.

- Minnesota State Highway 30
- Minnesota State Highway 56

== Demographics ==
Historical population
Census	Pop.	Note	%±
1900	439		—
1910	586		33.5%
1920	799		36.3%
1930	730		−8.6%
1940	742		1.6%
1950	805		8.5%
1960	889		10.4%
1970	939		5.6%
1980	1,243		32.4%
1990	1,283		3.2%
2000	1,325		3.3%
2010	1,340		1.1%
2020	1,364		1.8%
U.S. Decennial Census

=== 2010 census ===
As of the census of 2010, there were 1,340 people, 547 households, and 348 families living in the city. The population density was 1,055.1 inhabitants per square mile (407.4/km^{2}). There were 597 housing units at an average density of 470.1 per square mile (181.5/km^{2}). The racial makeup of the city was 95.4% White, 0.4% African American, 0.5% Native American, 0.1% Asian, 0.1% Pacific Islander, 1.6% from other races, and 1.9% from two or more races. Hispanic or Latino people of any race were 5.5% of the population.

There were 547 households, of which 34.6% had children under the age of 18 living with them, 45.9% were married couples living together, 11.2% had a female householder with no husband present, 6.6% had a male householder with no wife present, and 36.4% were non-families. 32.7% of all households were made up of individuals, and 15.2% had someone living alone who was 65 years of age or older. The average household size was 2.37 and the average family size was 2.95.

The median age in the city was 36 years. 27.2% of residents were under the age of 18; 7.6% were between the ages of 18 and 24; 24% were from 25 to 44; 23.3% were from 45 to 64; and 17.9% were 65 years of age or older. The gender makeup of the city was 48.7% male and 51.3% female.

=== 2000 census ===
As of the census of 2000, there were 1,325 people, 496 households, and 329 families living in the city. The population density was 1,049.6 inhabitants per square mile (405.3/km^{2}). There were 519 housing units at an average density of 411.1 per square mile (158.7/km^{2}). The racial makeup of the city was 97.28% White, 0.23% African American, 0.60% Native American, 0.68% Asian, 0.53% from other races, and 0.68% from two or more races. Hispanic or Latino people of any race were 2.26% of the population.

There were 496 households, out of which 35.7% had children under the age of 18 living with them, 55.0% were married couples living together, 8.3% had a female householder with no husband present, and 33.5% were non-families. 29.4% of all households were made up of individuals, and 17.5% had someone living alone who was 65 years of age or older. The average household size was 2.50 and the average family size was 3.15.

In the city, the population was spread out, with 27.3% under the age of 18, 9.4% from 18 to 24, 24.8% from 25 to 44, 18.0% from 45 to 64, and 20.5% who were 65 years of age or older. The median age was 37 years. For every 100 females, there were 91.8 males. For every 100 females age 18 and over, there were 84.1 males.

The median income for a household in the city was $38,214, and the median income for a family was $47,981. Males had a median income of $29,293 versus $24,135 for females. The per capita income for the city was $17,201. About 1.2% of families and 4.4% of the population were below the poverty line, including 2.2% of those under age 18 and 11.7% of those age 65 or over.

== Schools ==
Hayfield has two schools, an elementary school and a secondary school. Their school colors are blue and gold, and their mascot is the Vikings. They compete in the Gopher Conference. They have the following sports in their district: baseball, basketball (boys' and girls'), cross country, dance, football, hockey, softball, track and field, golf (boys' and girls'), volleyball, and wrestling.

== Parks and recreation ==
=== Parks ===
The city of Hayfield has two parks in town for the public to use. The Earl B. Himle Park and the Rouhoff Memorial Park. Earl Himle Park is located next to the city of Hayfields public pool and softball field.

== Religion ==
- Cedar Creek Church
- Evanger Lutheran Church, ELCA
- First Presbyterian Church
- Sacred Heart Catholic Church
- Trinity Lutheran Church
- West St. Olaf Lutheran Church, ELCA

== Notable people ==
- Russell L. Blaisdell, United States military chaplain and Presbyterian minister; born in Hayfield
- George R. Wicker, Minnesota legislator, businessman, and newspaper editor; worked in Hayfield
- Dave Senjem, Minnesota politician and member of the Minnesota Senate. He served as its majority leader from 2011 to 2013
- Randy Demmer, Minnesota politician and a former member of the Minnesota House of Representatives
- Herman J. Kording, Minnesota state legislator and farmer, born in Hayfield
