= West Concord, Minnesota =

City in Minnesota, United States

- City
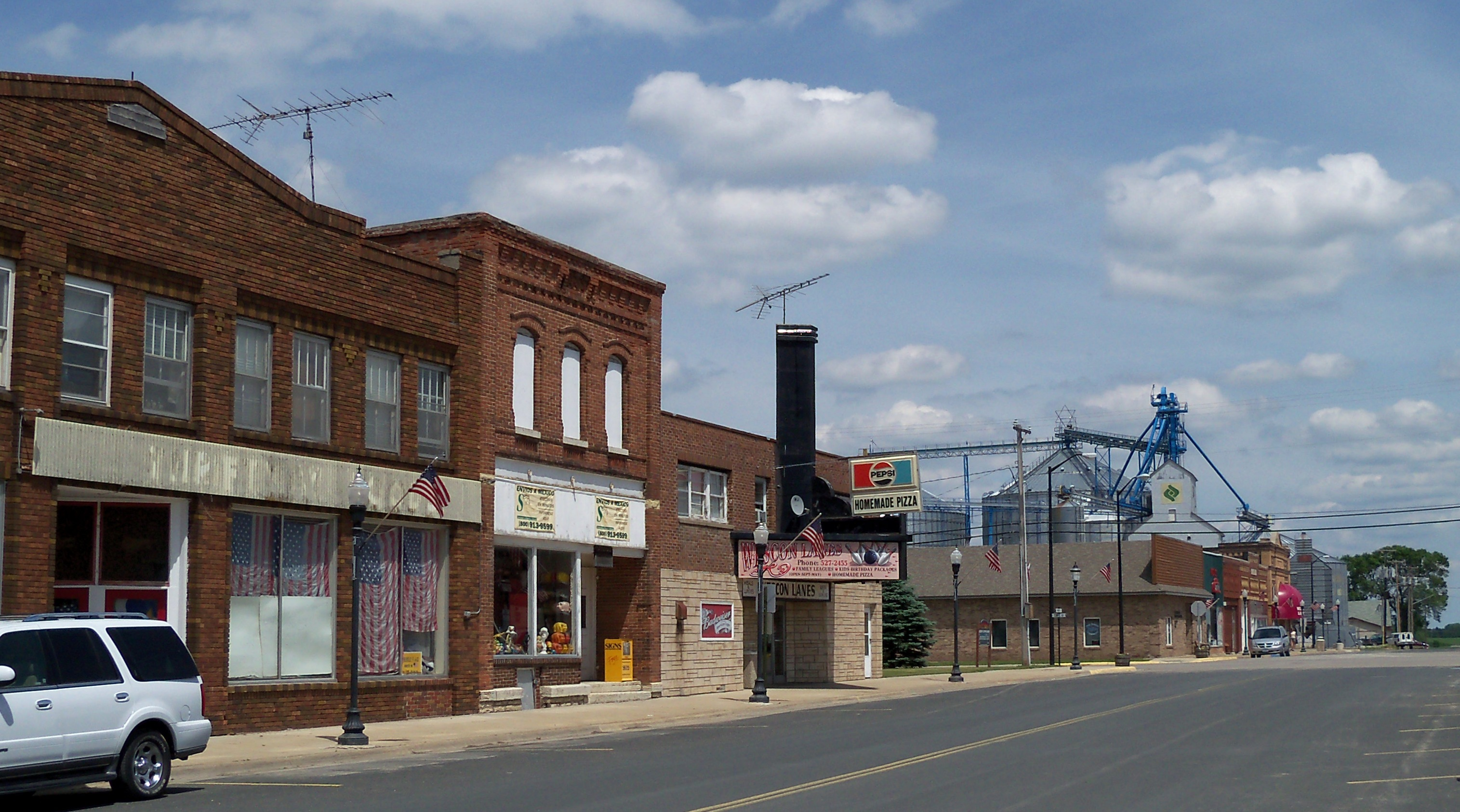
- Downtown West Concord (2010)
- Motto: "A Proud Heritage; A Bright Future"
- Location within Dodge County and Minnesota
- Coordinates: 44°09′10″N 92°53′58″W
- Country: United States
- State: Minnesota
- County: Dodge
- Platted: 1885
- Named for: Concord, New Hampshire

Government
  - Type: Mayor–Council
  - Mayor: Jeffrey McCool

Area
  - Total: 1.08 sq mi (2.79 km^{2})
  - Land: 1.07 sq mi (2.78 km^{2})
  - Water: 0 sq mi (0.00 km^{2})
- Elevation: 1,230 ft (370 m)

Population (2020)
  - Total: 861
  - Density: 802/sq mi (310/km^{2})
- Time zone: UTC-6 (Central (CST))
  - Summer (DST): UTC-5 (CDT)
- ZIP code: 55985
- Area code: 507
- FIPS code: 27-69304
- GNIS ID: 2397265
- Website: westconcordmn.com

West Concord is a city in Dodge County, Minnesota, United States. As of the 2020 census, its population was 861.

== History ==
West Concord was platted in 1885. A large share of the early settlers of the area were from New England, New York or Pennsylvania and West Concord, and well as Concord Township which surrounds it, were named after Concord, New Hampshire. A post office has been in operation at West Concord since 1885.

== Geography ==
According to the United States Census Bureau, the city has a total area of 1.06 square miles (2.75 km^{2}), all land.

Minnesota State Highway 56 runs north and south through the city.

Dodge County Road 24 runs through the north end of the city going east and west.

== Demographics ==
Historical population
Census	Pop.	Note	%±
1900	635		—
1910	584		−8.0%
1920	704		20.5%
1930	613		−12.9%
1940	744		21.4%
1950	770		3.5%
1960	810		5.2%
1970	718		−11.4%
1980	762		6.1%
1990	871		14.3%
2000	836		−4.0%
2010	782		−6.5%
2020	861		10.1%
U.S. Decennial Census

=== 2010 census ===
As of the census of 2010, there were 782 people, 319 households, and 215 families living in the city. The population density was 737.7 inhabitants per square mile (284.8/km^{2}). There were 372 housing units at an average density of 350.9 per square mile (135.5/km^{2}). The racial makeup of the city was 93.0% White, 0.1% African American, 0.5% Native American, 2.8% from other races, and 3.6% from two or more races. Hispanic or Latino of any race were 8.1% of the population.

There were 319 households, of which 34.2% had children under the age of 18 living with them, 51.1% were married couples living together, 7.5% had a female householder with no husband present, 8.8% had a male householder with no wife present, and 32.6% were non-families. 28.2% of all households were made up of individuals, and 13.4% had someone living alone who was 65 years of age or older. The average household size was 2.43 and the average family size was 2.93.

The median age in the city was 36.2 years. 27.1% of residents were under the age of 18; 8% were between the ages of 18 and 24; 26.9% were from 25 to 44; 21.3% were from 45 to 64; and 16.6% were 65 years of age or older. The gender makeup of the city was 50.9% male and 49.1% female.

=== 2000 census ===
As of the census of 2000, there were 836 people, 334 households, and 230 families living in the city. The population density was 784.0 inhabitants per square mile (302.7/km^{2}). There were 344 housing units at an average density of 322.6 per square mile (124.6/km^{2}). The racial makeup of the city was 95.57% White, 0.12% Native American, 0.12% Asian, 3.11% from other races, and 1.08% from two or more races. Hispanic or Latino of any race were 5.38% of the population.

There were 334 households, out of which 35.6% had children under the age of 18 living with them, 56.6% were married couples living together, 8.7% had a female householder with no husband present, and 31.1% were non-families. 26.3% of all households were made up of individuals, and 15.0% had someone living alone who was 65 years of age or older. The average household size was 2.49 and the average family size was 3.01.

In the city, the population was spread out, with 27.8% under the age of 18, 8.1% from 18 to 24, 27.6% from 25 to 44, 17.9% from 45 to 64, and 18.5% who were 65 years of age or older. The median age was 35 years. For every 100 females, there were 98.1 males. For every 100 females age 18 and over, there were 93.6 males.

The median income for a household in the city was $39,453, and the median income for a family was $48,438. Males had a median income of $31,797 versus $22,368 for females. The per capita income for the city was $16,958. About 6.0% of families and 7.9% of the population were below the poverty line, including 8.8% of those under age 18 and 14.1% of those age 65 or over.

== Economy ==
- Minnesota Implement

== Education ==
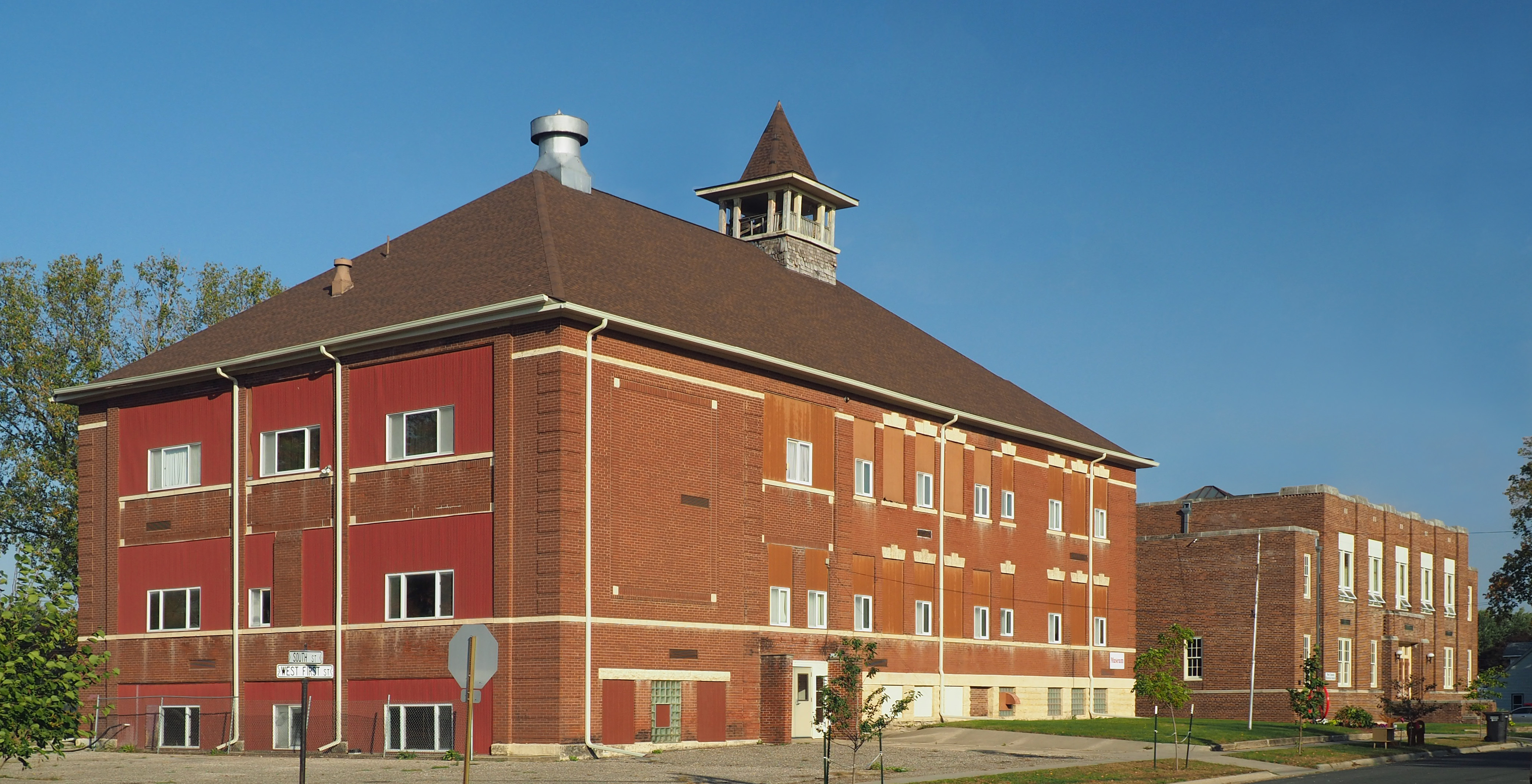
Historic school buildings (2025)

West Concord High School's mascot was the Cardinal. The school colors were red and white.

In 1990, West Concord's school district merged with the towns of Dodge Center and Claremont to form Triton Public Schools. West Concord's former high school building became Triton Junior High. Dodge Center is now home to Triton Primary, Triton Middle School, and Triton Senior High School. The first commencement exercises of Triton High School were held in 1991.

Triton's school mascot is the Cobra. The school colors are maroon and gray. The annual yearbook is titled Triton Tradition and the first volume was published in 1991.

West Concord Public Charter School was a free public school established in July 2012, and opened to students in fall 2013. Due to low enrollment the school closed four years after opening.

== Notable people ==
- Mel Frederick, politician and businessman.

== See also ==
- West Concord Public Library
- Tornado outbreak of May 15–16, 1968
- Tornado outbreak and derecho of December 15–16, 2021
