= Zumbro River =

River in the United States of America

Zumbro River Rivière des Embarras
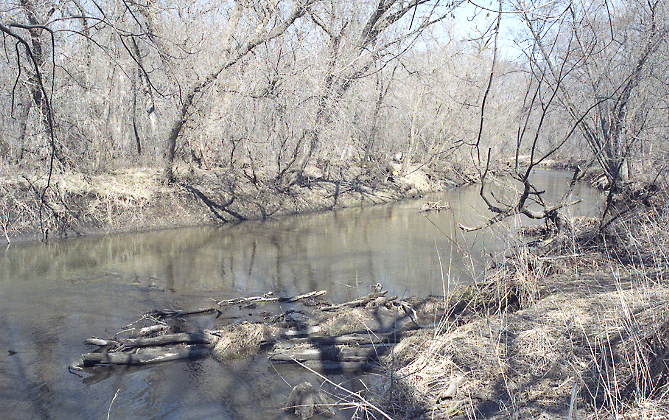
- The North Fork of the Zumbro River in Zumbrota

- Mouth of the Zumbro River
- Native name: Wazi Ożu Wakpa (Dakota)

Location
- Country: United States
- State: Minnesota
- Counties: Olmsted, Wabasha

Physical characteristics
- Source
  - location: Zumbro Lake
  - coordinates: 44.1527433°N 92.4671246°W
- Mouth
  - location: Alma City, Minnesota
  - coordinates: 44.2916319°N 91.9279396°W
- Length: 64.6 miles (104.0 km)

Basin features
- River system: Upper Mississippi River
- Tributaries
  - left: North Branch Middle Fork Zumbro River, North Fork Zumbro River, Spring Creek, Trout Brook
  - right: Fry Slough, Long Creek, Middle Creek, Middle Fork Zumbro River, Pine Slough, Silver Spring Creek, South Branch Middle Fork Zumbro River, South Fork Zumbro River, West Indian Creek
- Waterbodies: Zumbro Lake

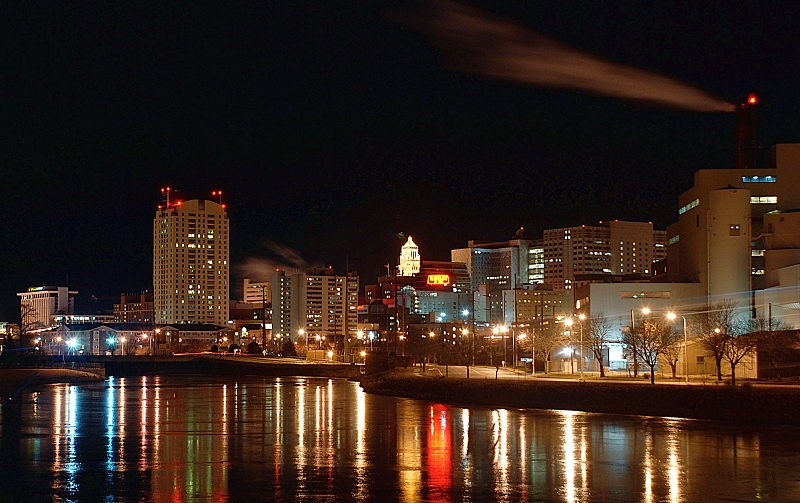
Nighttime view of the South Fork Zumbro River as it passes through Rochester's Downtown area from Silver Lake Park in the 2000s

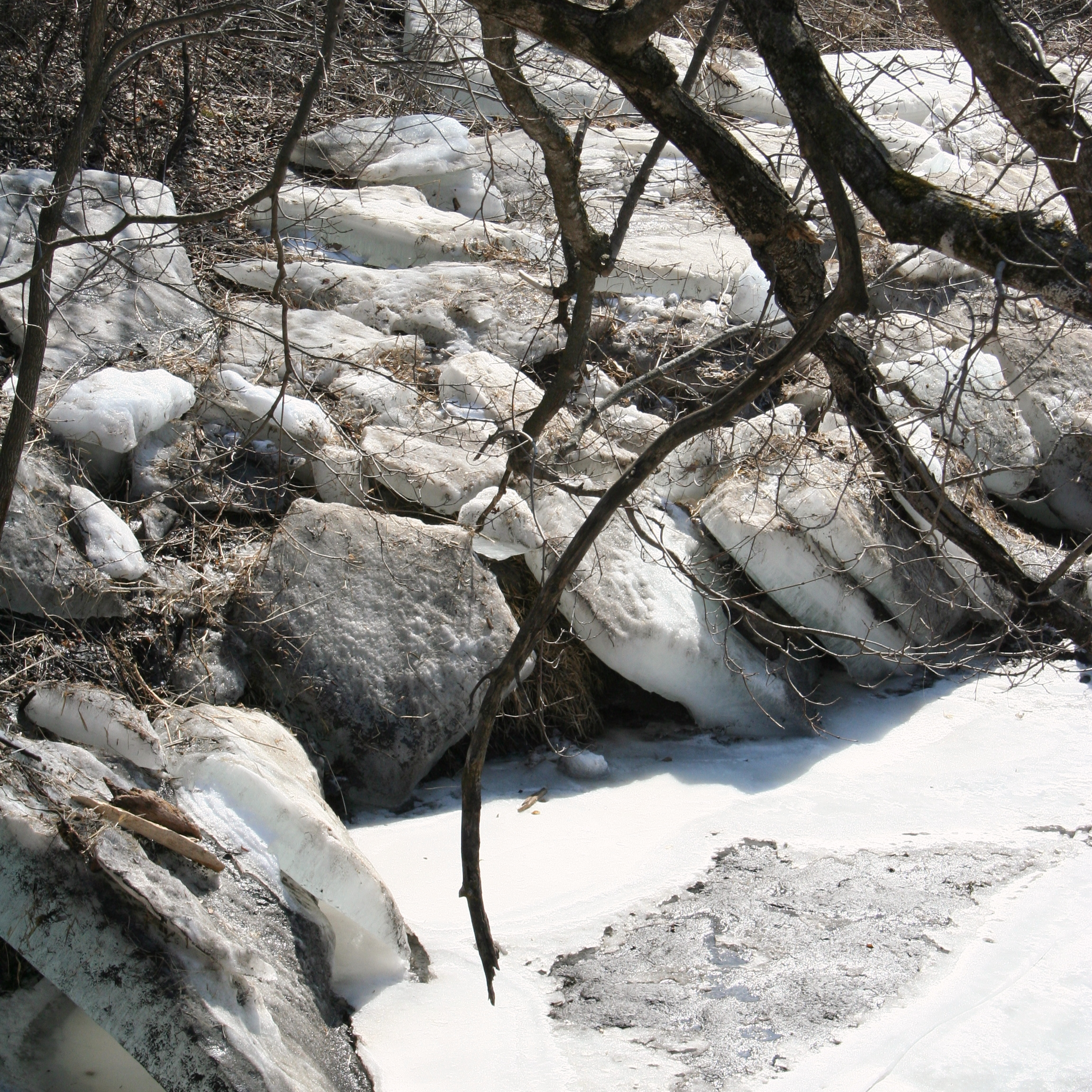
Ice on the Zumbro in March

The Zumbro River is a tributary of the Mississippi River in the Driftless Area of southeastern Minnesota in the United States. It is 64.6 miles (104.0 km) long from the confluence of its principal tributaries and drains a watershed of 1,428 square miles (3,700 km^{2}). The river's name in English is a change from its French name Rivière des Embarras ("Obstruction River") due to its mouth near Pine Island in the Mississippi River; the pronunciation changed from [dez‿ɑ̃.ba.ʁɑ] to /zʊmbroʊ/. The Dakota name for this river is Wazi Ożu Wakpa (Pines Planted River), having reference to the grove of great white pines at Pine Island.

== Course ==
The Zumbro rises as three forks:

The South Fork Zumbro River, 57.6 miles (92.7 km) long, rises about 2 miles (3 km) east of Hayfield in southern Dodge County and flows generally eastwardly into Olmsted County, where it turns northward at Rochester and flows into southwestern Wabasha County. The South Fork's course through Rochester has been channelized as part of a flood control project. It is dammed in Wabasha County, by the Lake Zumbro Hydroelectric Generating Plant to form Lake Zumbro.

At Rochester, the river measures approximately 153 cubic feet per second (4.3 m^{3}/s).

The Middle Fork Zumbro River, 52.9 miles (85.1 km) long, rises in northeastern Steele County, about 8 miles (13 km) west of West Concord and flows generally eastwardly through northern Dodge, southwestern Goodhue and northeastern Olmsted counties, past Pine Island and Oronoco. At Pine Island it collects the North Branch Middle Fork Zumbro River, which rises in southwestern Goodhue County and flows eastwardly through southern Goodhue and northern Dodge counties. At Oronoco it collects the South Branch Middle Fork Zumbro River, which rises in eastern Steele County and flows eastwardly into Dodge County, past Mantorville. The Middle Fork meets the South Fork in north-central Olmsted County as part of Zumbro Lake.

The North Fork Zumbro River, 57.5 miles (92.5 km) long, rises 7.5 miles (12.1 km) southeast of Faribault in southeastern Rice County and flows eastwardly through southern Goodhue and southwestern Wabasha counties, past Kenyon, Wanamingo, Zumbrota and Mazeppa.

The North and South forks join about 4 miles (6 km) east of Mazeppa in southwestern Wabasha County, and the Zumbro River flows eastwardly through Wabasha County, through the Richard J. Dorer Memorial Hardwood State Forest and past Zumbro Falls, Hammond, Millville and Kellogg. It flows into the Mississippi River about 4 miles (6 km) east of Kellogg. At this town, the river measures approximately 880 cubic feet per second (25 m^{3}/s) .

== Fish species near Rochester ==
Some species of fish that can be found in the Zumbro River near Rochester include the green sunfish; rock, smallmouth and largemouth bass; the common carp, creek chub, channel catfish, and northern pike.

== See also ==
- List of Minnesota rivers
