= Rochester metropolitan area, Minnesota =

Rochester metropolitan area
- Metropolitan statistical area
- Rochester, MN Metropolitan Statistical Area
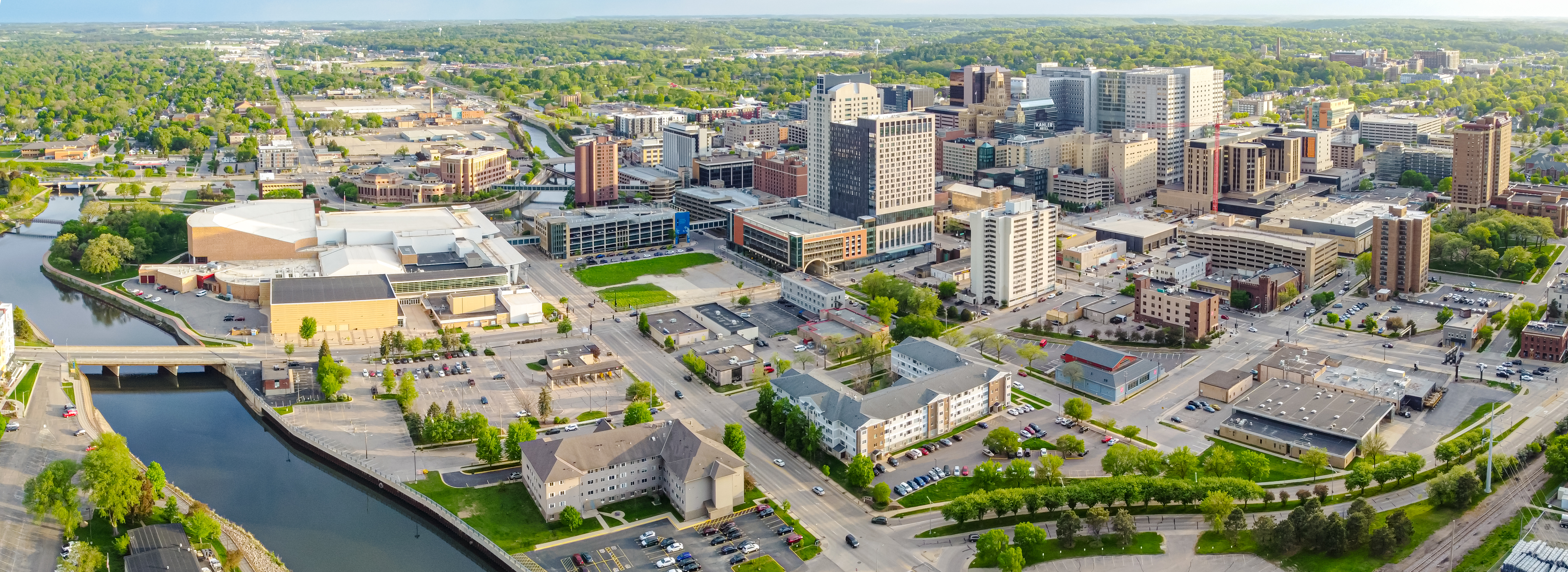
- Rochester, Minnesota skyline
Interactive map of Rochester, MN MSA
City of Rochester
Rochester, MN MSA
Other Counties in the Rochester, MN CSA
- Coordinates: 43°57′22″N 92°20′17″W
- Country: United States
- State: Minnesota
- Largest city: Rochester
- Other cities: Byron, Kasson, Lake City, Stewartville

Area
  - Total: 2,477 sq mi (6,420 km^{2})
- Lowest elevation: 1,211 ft (369 m)

Population (2020)
  - Total: 226,329 (Metro); 316,029 (Combined)
  - Estimate (2024): 230,742 (Metro); 321,615 (Combined)
  - Rank: Metro: 207th in the U.S. Combined: 113th in the U.S.
  - Density: 91.37/sq mi (35.28/km^{2})

GDP
  - Total: $17.949 billion (2023)
- Time zone: UTC–6 (Central (CST))
  - Summer (DST): UTC–5 (CDT)
- Area codes: 507 and 924

The Rochester metropolitan statistical area, as defined by the United States Census Bureau, is a metropolitan statistical area consisting of four counties in southeast Minnesota, Dodge, Fillmore, Olmsted, and Wabasha. The principal city is Rochester, the city, which has a population of 121,395.

A July 1, 2024 census estimate placed the population at 230,742, an increase of 1.95% from the 2020 census, an increase of 11.54% from the 2010 census, and an increase of 24.90% from the 2000 census.

== Counties ==
- Olmsted (166,424)
- Wabasha (21,574)
- Fillmore (21,502)
- Dodge (21,242)

== Communities ==
=== Incorporated Places ===
- Rochester (123,624)
- Kasson (7,207)
- Stewartville (6,919)
- Byron (6,809)
- Lake City (5,306) – partial
- Pine Island (3,870) – partial
- Plainview (3,498)
- Chatfield (3,023)
- Dodge Center (2,939)
- Wabasha (2,598)
- Spring Valley (2,445)
- Oronoco (2,040)
- Eyota (2,025)
- Rushford (1,852)
- Hayfield (1,361)
- Preston (1,316)
- Elgin (1,139)
- Mantorville (1,110)
- Harmony (1,030)
- Mazeppa (869)
- West Concord (842)
- Rushford Village (799)
- Dover (771)
- Lanesboro (712)
- Mabel (705)
- Claremont (499)
- Wykoff (430)
- Kellogg (426)
- Fountain (406)
- Canton (313)
- Peterson (227)
- Ostrander (226)
- Bellechester (175) – partial
- Zumbro Falls (154)
- Millville (144)
- Hammond (129)
- Minneiska (97) – partial
- Whalan (69)

=== Census-designated places ===
- Marion (308)
- High Forest (132)

=== Unincorporated places ===
- Bear Valley
- Berne
- Bratsberg
- Camp Lacupolis
- Carimona
- Cherry Grove
- Chester
- Clear Grit
- Conception
- Concord
- Cummingsville
- Danesville – partial
- Douglas
- Dumfries
- Eden
- Elliota
- Etna
- Fillmore
- Granger
- Greenleafton
- Genoa
- Hamilton
- Henrytown
- Highland
- Jarrett
- Judge
- Lenora
- Maple Springs
- Newburg
- Oak Center
- Oslo
- Pleasant Grove
- Post Town
- Potsdam
- Predmore
- Prosper
- Reads Landing
- Ringe
- Rock Dell
- Salem Corners
- Shanty Town
- Simpson
- South Troy
- Theilman
- Viola
- Vlasaty
- Wasioja
- Weaver
- West Albany
- West Newton
- York

=== Ghost town ===
- Clear Grit
- Elliota
- Forestville
- Rice Lake

=== Townships ===
- Marion (4,166)
- Cascade (2,835)
- Oronoco (2,537)
- Rochester (2,234)
- Mantorville (1,866)
- Haverhill (1,482)
- Greenfield (1,310)
- New Haven (1,286)
- Kalmar (1,158)
- Salem (1,074)
- High Forest (949)
- Wasioja (847)
- Milton (742)
- Pleasant Grove (733)
- Elgin (689)
- Rock Dell (685)
- Canton (675)
- Vernon (660)
- Mazeppa (655)
- Zumbro (651)
- Canisteo (587)
- Concord (561)
- Spring Valley (559)
- Chatfield (544)
- Orion (536)
- Viola (532)
- Gillford (508)
- Eyota (503)
- Fillmore (502)
- Sumner (501)
- Hayfield (482)
- Plainview (465)
- Mount Pleasant (453)
- Highland (448)
- Newburg (448)
- Bristol (433)
- Lake (432)
- Amherst (425)
- Westfield (424)
- Claremont (419)
- Chester (417)
- Harmony (403)
- Jordan (396)
- Farmington (386)
- Pilot Mound (386)
- West Albany (386)
- Carrolton (385)
- Oakwood (385)
- Dover (383)
- Preston (383)
- Norway (381)
- York (378)
- Forestville (377)
- Pepin (375)
- Elmira (360)
- Quincy (339)
- Bloomfield (335)
- Arendahl (316)
- Fountain (313)
- Ashland (306)
- Carimona (294)
- Hyde Park (259)
- Glasgow (258)
- Watopa (250)
- Holt (243)
- Beaver (219)
- Preble (215)
- Ellington (213)
- Minneiska (183)
- Ripley (177)

== Demographics ==
Historical population
Census	Pop.	Note	%±
1850	243		—
1860	34,091		13,929.2%
1870	69,128		102.8%
1880	79,255		14.6%
1890	73,638		−7.1%
1900	83,671		13.6%
1910	78,825		−5.8%
1920	83,815		6.3%
1930	91,914		9.7%
1940	99,072		7.8%
1950	102,195		3.2%
1960	119,566		17.0%
1970	136,281		14.0%
1980	148,044		8.6%
1990	162,722		9.9%
2000	184,740		13.5%
2010	206,877		12.0%
2020	226,329		9.4%
2024 (est.)	230,742		1.9%
U.S. Decennial Census; 1790–1960 1900–1990; 1990–2000 2010–2020

=== 2000 census ===
As of the 2000 census, there were 163,618 people, 62,504 households, and 43,046 families residing within the MSA. The racial makeup of the MSA was 92.01% White, 2.09% African American, 0.25% Native American, 3.34% Asian, 0.03% Pacific Islander, 0.99% from other races, and 1.29% from two or more races. Hispanic or Latino of any race were 2.35% of the population.

The median income for a household in the MSA was $46,957, and the median income for a family was $55,450. Males had a median income of $35,815 versus $26,738 for females. The per capita income for the MSA was $21,287.

== Transportation ==
=== Highways ===
==== Interstate Highways ====
- Interstate 90

==== US Highways ====
- U.S. Highway 14
- U.S. Highway 52
- U.S. Highway 61
- U.S. Highway 63
- U.S. Highway 218 (briefly runs through Dodge County)

==== Minnesota State Highways ====
- Minnesota State Highway 16
- Minnesota State Highway 30
- Minnesota State Highway 42
- Minnesota State Highway 43
- Minnesota State Highway 44
- Minnesota State Highway 56
- Minnesota State Highway 57
- Minnesota State Highway 60
- Minnesota State Highway 74
- Minnesota State Highway 80
- Minnesota State Highway 139
- Minnesota State Highway 247
- Minnesota State Highway 250

=== Public Airports ===
==== Commercial ====
- Rochester International Airport

==== General Aviation ====
- Dodge Center Airport
- Fillmore County Airport
- Rushford Municipal Airport

== Government and politics ==
=== Federal Representation ===
All of the Rochester metropolitan area falls in Minnesota's 1st Congressional District, represented by Republican Brad Finstad.

=== State Senate Legislators ===
The following list shows the Rochester metropolitan area's representation in the Minnesota Senate:

Name	District	First elected	Party	County Represented within MSA
Steve Drazkowski	District 20	2022	Republican	Goodhue, Wabasha, Olmsted
Gene Dornink	District 23	2020	Republican	Mower
Carla Nelson	District 24	2010	Republican	Dodge, Olmsted
Liz Boldon	District 25	2022	DFL	Olmsted
Jeremy Miller	District 26	2010	Republican	Fillmore, Mower

== See also ==
- Minnesota statistical areas
