= Douglas, Minnesota =

Douglas
- Unincorporated community
- Location within Minnesota Location within the United States
- Coordinates: 44°06′29″N 92°34′26″W
- Country: United States
- State: Minnesota
- County: Olmsted
- Township: Kalmar Township and New Haven Township
- Elevation: 1,083 ft (330 m)
- Time zone: UTC-6 (Central (CST))
  - Summer (DST): UTC-5 (CDT)
- ZIP code: 55960
- Area code: 507
- GNIS feature ID: 642905

Douglas is an unincorporated community in Olmsted County, Minnesota, United States. The community is located along 75th Street NW (County 14) near its junction with County Road 3. Douglas is located within Kalmar Township and New Haven Township. Nearby places include Oronoco, Rochester, and the Douglas State Trail. The community is about two miles from the city of Rochester.

It was named for Harrison Douglas, the original owner of the town site. A post office was established at Douglas in 1878, and remained in operation until 1963.
