= Ringe, Minnesota =

Ringe
- Unincorporated community
- Location within Minnesota Location within the United States
- Coordinates: 44°06′29″N 92°23′58″W
- Country: United States
- State: Minnesota
- County: Olmsted
- Township: Farmington Township and Haverhill Township
- Elevation: 1,207 ft (368 m)
- Time zone: UTC-6 (Central (CST))
  - Summer (DST): UTC-5 (CDT)
- ZIP code: 55906
- Area code: 507
- GNIS feature ID: 654905

Ringe is an unincorporated community in Olmsted County, Minnesota, United States, near Rochester. The community is located along 75th Street NE near 40th Avenue NE. Ringe is located within Farmington Township and Haverhill Township.
