= Potsdam, Minnesota =

Potsdam
- Unincorporated community
- Location within Minnesota Location within the United States
- Coordinates: 44°09′56″N 92°20′21″W
- Country: United States
- State: Minnesota
- County: Olmsted
- Township: Farmington Township
- Elevation: 1,138 ft (347 m)
- Time zone: UTC-6 (Central (CST))
  - Summer (DST): UTC-5 (CDT)
- ZIP code: 55932
- Area code: 507
- GNIS feature ID: 649691

Potsdam is an unincorporated community in Farmington Township, Olmsted County, Minnesota, United States, near Elgin and Rochester. The community is located along State Highway 247 (MN 247) near Olmsted County Road 11. The boundary line between Olmsted and Wabasha counties is nearby.

== History ==
Potsdam was laid out circa 1860, and named after Potsdam, in Germany. A post office was established at Potsdam in 1873, and remained in operation until 1905.
