= Genoa, Minnesota =

Genoa
- Unincorporated community
- Location within Minnesota Location within the United States
- Coordinates: 44°06′36″N 92°36′27″W
- Country: United States
- State: Minnesota
- County: Olmsted
- Township: New Haven Township and Kalmar Township
- Elevation: 1,014 ft (309 m)
- Time zone: UTC-6 (Central (CST))
  - Summer (DST): UTC-5 (CDT)
- ZIP code: 55963 and 55920
- Area code: 507
- GNIS feature ID: 644070

Genoa is an unincorporated community in Olmsted County, Minnesota, United States. The community is located along 75th Street NW (County 14) near Exchange Avenue. Genoa is located within New Haven Township and Kalmar Township. Nearby places include Oronoco, Pine Island, and Byron. The South Branch Middle Fork of the Zumbro River flows nearby.

== History ==
Genoa was platted in 1865, and named after Genoa, in Italy. A post office was established at Genoa in 1872, and remained in operation until 1905.
