= Eyota =

Eyota can refer to a community in the United States:

- The city of Eyota, Minnesota
- Eyota Township, Minnesota
