= Cascade Township =

Cascade Township may refer to the following places in the United States of America:

- Cascade Township, Michigan
- Cascade Township, Minnesota
- Cascade Township, Lycoming County, Pennsylvania
