= Minnesota State Highway 247 =

State highway in Minnesota, United States

Trunk Highway 247
- MN 247 highlighted in red

Route information
- Maintained by MnDOT
- Length: 12.604 mi (20.284 km)
- Existed: July 1, 1949–present

Major junctions
- West end: US 63 / CR 12 near Rochester
- East end: MN 42 / CR 8 in Plainview

Location
- Country: United States
- State: Minnesota
- Counties: Olmsted, Wabasha

Highway system
- Minnesota Trunk Highway System; Interstate; US; State; Legislative; Scenic
← MN 246	→ MN 248

Minnesota State Highway 247 (MN 247) is a 12.604-mile-long (20.284 km) highway in southeast Minnesota, which runs from its intersection with U.S. Highway 63 in Farmington Township, north of Rochester; and continues east to its eastern terminus at its intersection with State Highway 42 in the city of Plainview.

== Route description ==
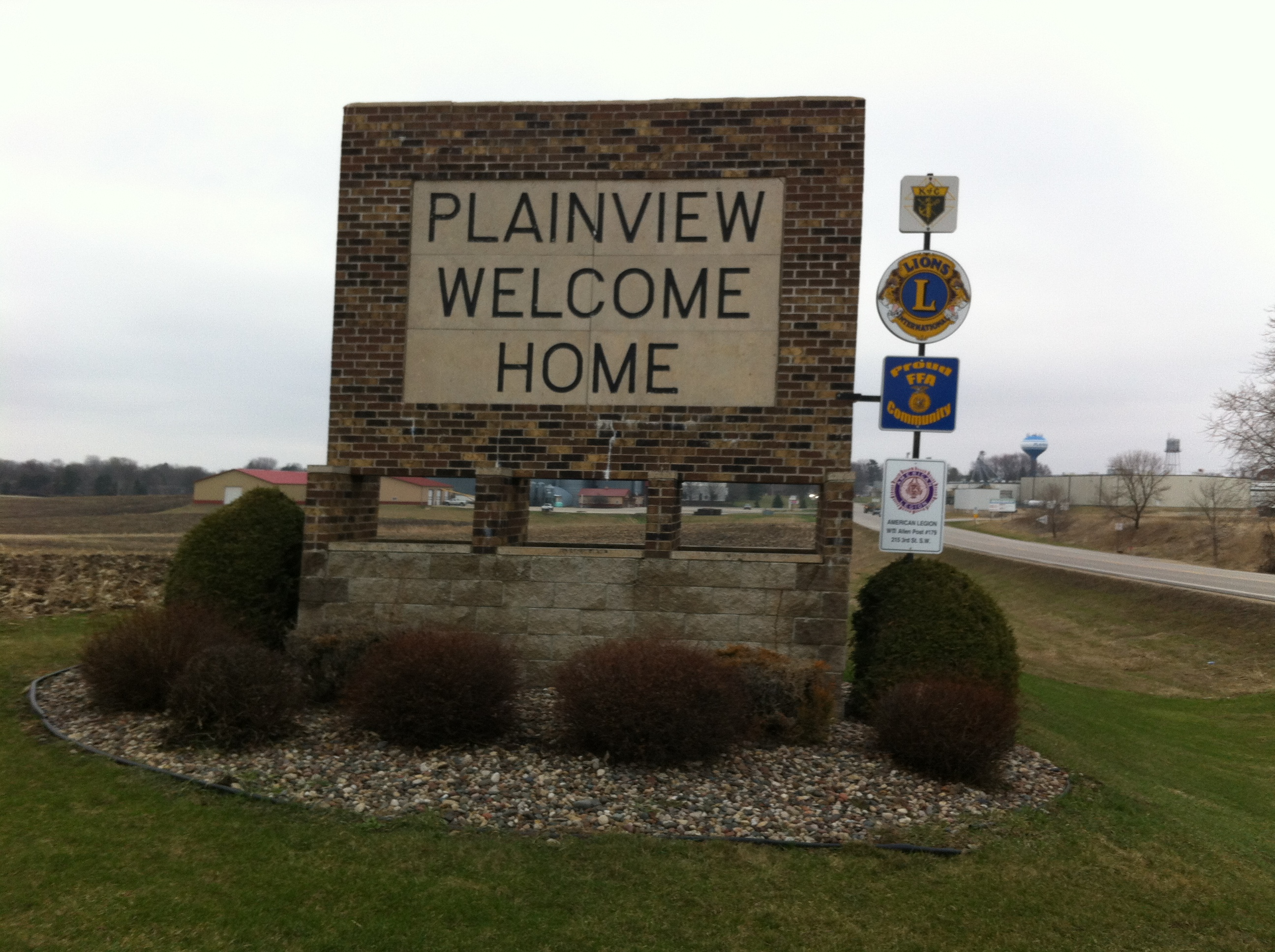
Plainview Welcome Home on Minnesota State Highway 247

Highway 247 serves as an east–west route between Farmington Township, the unincorporated community of Potsdam, and the city of Plainview.

In the city of Plainview, Highway 247 follows West Broadway, which is also the main street of Plainview.

The route is legally defined as Route 247 in the Minnesota Statutes.

== History ==
Highway 247 was authorized on July 1, 1949.

At the time it was marked, the highway was only paved in Potsdam and Plainview. The remainder of the route was paved in the mid-1950s.

== Major intersections ==
County	Location	mi	km	Destinations	Notes
Olmsted	Farmington Township	0.000	0.000	US 63, CR 12 west	
Olmsted	Farmington Township	2.982	4.799	CR 11 south	
Olmsted	Potsdam	3.981	6.407	CR 11 north	
Wabasha	Elgin Township	7.950	12.794	CR 2	
Wabasha	Plainview	11.977	19.275	CR 8 (10th Street NW)	
Wabasha	Plainview	12.043	19.381	CR 57 (9th Street SW)	
Wabasha	Plainview	12.471	20.070	CR 56 (3rd Street SW)	
Wabasha	Plainview	12.681	20.408	MN 42 (Wabasha Street), CR 8 (East Broadway) east	
1.000 mi = 1.609 km; 1.000 km = 0.621 mi
