= Douglas State Trail =

Trail in southeast Minnesota

Coordinates: 44°7′39″N 92°35′19″W

- Length: 12.5 mi (20.1 km)
- Location: Southeast Minnesota, USA
- Designation: Minnesota state trail
- Trailheads: Rochester; Pine Island
- Use: Biking, hiking, horseback riding, in-line skating, snowmobiling
- Grade: Level
- Difficulty: Easy
- Season: Year-round
- Hazards: Severe weather
- Surface: Parallel asphalt and gravel
- Website: Douglas State Trail

The Douglas State Trail is a 12.5-mile (20.1 km) multiple-use rail trail in Minnesota, USA.

It occupies the abandoned Chicago Great Western Railway corridor between Rochester and Pine Island, passing through Douglas along the way. The trail has a paved track for cyclists, hikers, in-line skaters and skiers, as well as a natural surface track for horseback riders and snowmobilers.

The Cannon Valley Trail between Cannon Falls and Red Wing makes use of another segment of the same abandoned CGW right-of-way.
