= Post Town, Minnesota =

Post Town
- Unincorporated community
- Location within Minnesota Location within the United States
- Coordinates: 44°05′26″N 92°38′20″W
- Country: United States
- State: Minnesota
- County: Olmsted
- Township: Kalmar Township
- Elevation: 1,033 ft (315 m)
- Time zone: UTC-6 (Central (CST))
  - Summer (DST): UTC-5 (CDT)
- ZIP code: 55920
- Area code: 507
- GNIS feature ID: 654889

Post Town is an unincorporated community in Kalmar Township, Olmsted County, Minnesota, United States, near Byron. The community is located near the junction of Olmsted County Roads 103 and 105 and is northeast of the nearby Oxbow Park and Zollman Zoo.
