= Shanty Town, Minnesota =

Shanty Town
- Unincorporated community
- Location within Minnesota Location within the United States
- Coordinates: 43°58′27″N 92°38′24″W
- Country: United States
- State: Minnesota
- County: Olmsted
- Township: Salem Township
- Elevation: 1,125 ft (343 m)
- Time zone: UTC-6 (Central (CST))
  - Summer (DST): UTC-5 (CDT)
- ZIP code: 55920
- Area code: 507
- GNIS feature ID: 654936

Shanty Town is an unincorporated community in Salem Township, Olmsted County, Minnesota, United States, near Byron. The community is located along Olmsted County Road 150 near 35th Street SW.
