= Minnesota State Highway 42 =

State highway in Minnesota, United States

Trunk Highway 42
- MN 42 highlighted in red

Route information
- Maintained by MnDOT
- Length: 30.717 mi (49.434 km)
- Existed: 1920–present

Major junctions
- South end: I-90 near Eyota
- US 14 at Eyota; MN 247 at Plainview
- North end: US 61 at Kellogg

Location
- Country: United States
- State: Minnesota
- Counties: Olmsted, Wabasha

Highway system
- Minnesota Trunk Highway System; Interstate; US; State; Legislative; Scenic
← MN 41	→ MN 43

Minnesota State Highway 42 (MN 42) is a 30.717-mile-long (49.434 km) highway in southeast Minnesota, which runs from its interchange with Interstate 90 near Eyota and continues north and northeast to its northern terminus at its intersection with U.S. Highway 61 in Kellogg.

== Route description ==
State Highway 42 serves as a north–south route between Eyota, Elgin, Plainview, and Kellogg in southeast Minnesota.

The route is also known as Wabasha Street in Plainview and 2nd Avenue in Elgin.

Highway 42 passes through the Richard J. Dorer State Forest between Plainview and Kellogg in Wabasha County.

Carley State Park is located four miles south of the junction of Highway 42 and Wabasha County Road 4 at Plainview. The park entrance is located on Wabasha County Road 4.

== History ==
State Highway 42 was authorized in 1920 between Eyota and Kellogg. The route was completely paved by 1940. Highway 42 was on its current alignment by 1953.

Highway 42 was extended south of Eyota to Interstate 90 in 2002.

From 1934 to 2002, the southern terminus of Highway 42 was located at its intersection with U.S. Highway 14 on the northern edge of Eyota.

== Major intersections ==
County	Location	mi	km	Destinations	Notes
Olmsted	Eyota Township	0.000	0.000	I-90 / CSAH 7 south – Austin, La Crosse	
Olmsted	Eyota Township	3.379	5.438	US 14 – Rochester, Winona	
Wabasha	Plainview	17.795	28.638	MN 247 west / CSAH 8 east	
Wabasha	Greenfield Township	30.717	49.434	US 61 / Great River Road – Wabasha, Winona	
1.000 mi = 1.609 km; 1.000 km = 0.621 mi
