= Olmsted County, Minnesota =

County in Minnesota, United States

- County
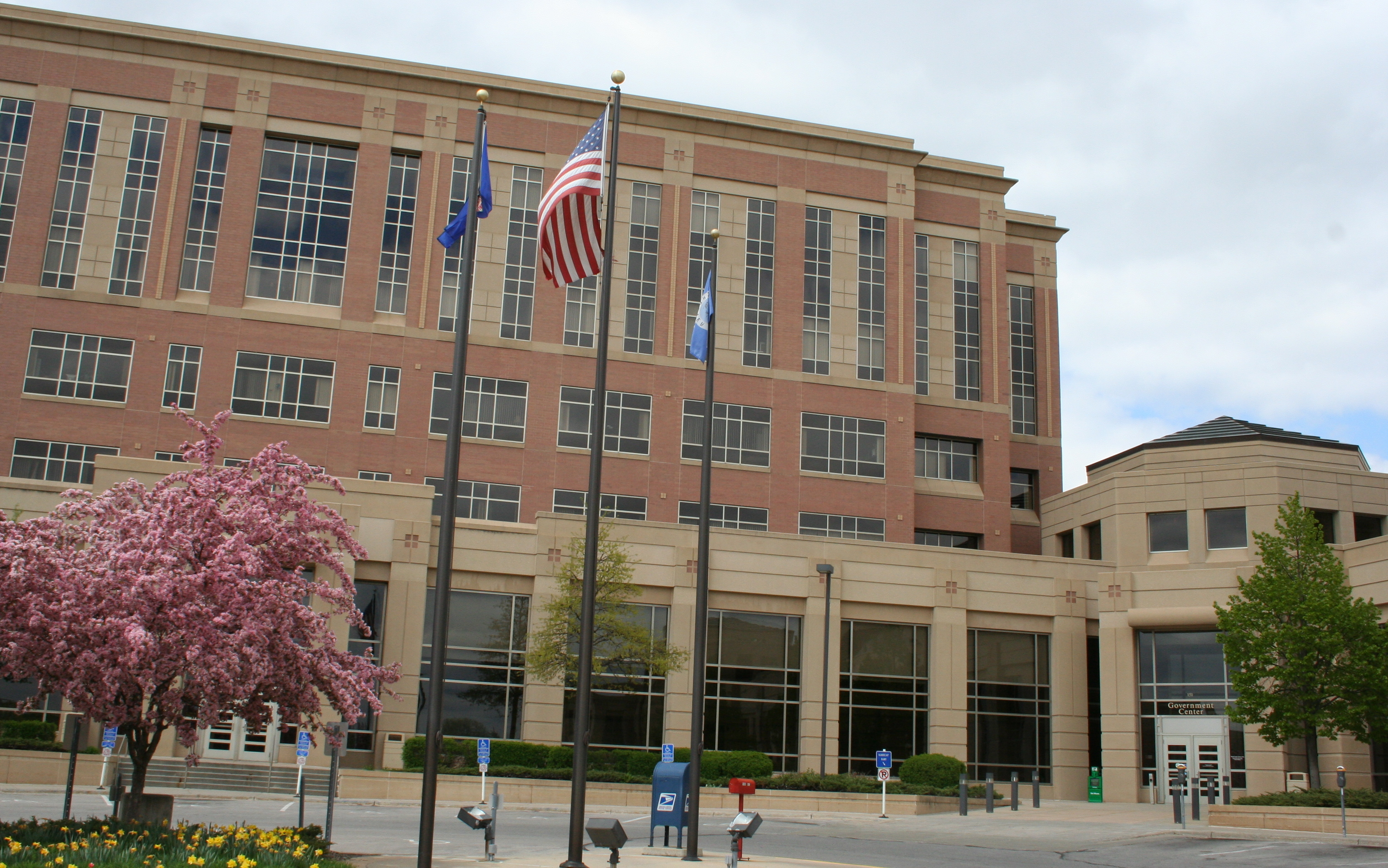
- Olmsted County Government Center (pre-expansion)

- Location within the U.S. state of Minnesota
- Coordinates: 43.999688°N 92.410155°W
- Country: United States
- State: Minnesota
- Founded: February 20, 1855 (created); August 27, 1855 (organized)
- Named for: David Olmsted
- Seat: Rochester
- Largest city: Rochester

Government
  - Body: Board of Commissioners
  - Chair: Dave Senjem

Area
  - Total: 654.754 sq mi (1,695.81 km^{2})
  - Land: 653.509 sq mi (1,692.58 km^{2})
  - Water: 1.245 sq mi (3.22 km^{2}) 0.19%

Population (2020)
  - Total: 162,847
  - Estimate (2025): 166,731 ▲
  - Density: 249.189/sq mi (96.2123/km^{2})
- Time zone: UTC−6 (Central)
  - Summer (DST): UTC−5 (CDT)
- Area code: 507 and 924
- Congressional district: 1st
- Website: olmstedcounty.gov

Olmsted County is a county located in the U.S. state of Minnesota. As of the 2020 census, the population is 162,847, and was estimated to be 166,731 in 2025, making it the seventh-most populous county in Minnesota. The county seat and the largest city is Rochester.

Olmsted County is part of the Rochester metropolitan area.

== History ==
The Wisconsin Territory was established by the federal government effective July 3, 1836, and existed until its eastern portion was granted statehood (as Wisconsin) in 1848. Therefore, the federal government set up the Minnesota Territory effective March 3, 1849. The newly organized territorial legislature created nine counties across the territory in October of that year. One of those original counties, Wabasha, had portions partitioned off in 1853 to create Fillmore and Rice counties. Then on February 20, 1855, portions of Rice, Wabasha, and Fillmore counties were partitioned off to create the present county, with Rochester (which was also platted that year) as county seat. The county name recognized David Olmsted (1822–1861), a member of the first territorial council and the fourth mayor of St. Paul.

The county boundaries have remained unchanged since 1855.

== Geography ==
Olmsted County is a fairly unusual mix of urban and rural areas in that there's no transition or buffer between the two environments. Rochester, Minnesota's third-largest city with roughly 123,000 people, sits in the Zumbro River valley at the center of the county. Outside the valley, with the exception of a small amount of urban growth in the last few years, is farmland with small agricultural communities and no directly adjacent suburbs. Stewartville, the county's second-largest city, has about 6,000 people.

Olmsted County is drained by three rivers, all flowing to the Mississippi. The Zumbro flows northward through the west central part of the county, into Wabasha County. The Whitewater flows northeast from the northeast part of the county into Winona County, and the Root flows east-southeastward through the lower part of the county into Fillmore County. The county terrain consists of low rolling hills, etched by drainage gullies and marked by occasional buttes. The available area is devoted to agriculture or developed for other uses. The terrain slopes to the east and north, and its highest point is a hill 7.5 miles (12.1 km) west of Stewartville, at 1,380 ft (420 m) ASL.

According to the United States Census Bureau, the county has a total area of 654.754 square miles (1,695.81 km^{2}), of which 653.509 square miles (1,692.58 km^{2}) is land and 1.245 square miles (3.22 km^{2}) (0.19%) is water. It is the 46th largest county in Minnesota by total area.

Soils of Olmsted County

It is one of four Minnesota counties that have no natural lakes (the other three are Mower, Pipestone, and Rock).

=== Transit ===
- Jefferson Lines
- Rochester City Lines
- Rochester Public Transit

=== Major highways ===
- Interstate 90
- U.S. Highway 14
- U.S. Highway 52
- U.S. Highway 63
- Minnesota State Highway 30
- Minnesota State Highway 42
- Minnesota State Highway 74
- Minnesota State Highway 247
- Olmsted County Highway 22

=== Airports ===
- Mid-Continent Airport
- Rochester International Airport (RST)

=== Adjacent counties ===
- Wabasha County – north
- Winona County – east
- Fillmore County – south
- Mower County – southwest
- Dodge County – west
- Goodhue County – northwest

=== Protected areas ===
- Chester Woods Park
- High Forest Wildlife Management Area
- Keller Wildlife Management Area
- Marian Marshall Wildlife Management Area
- Nelson Fen Wildlife Management Area
- Oronoco Scientific and Natural Area
- Oxbow Park & Zollman Zoo
- Root River Park
- Schumann State Wildlife Management Area
- Suess State Wildlife Management Area
- Whitewater Wildlife Management Area (part)

=== Lakes ===
Olmsted County has no natural lakes, but does have six reservoirs created by dams:

- Chester Lake: Eyota Township
- Lake Florence: High Forest Township
- Lake George: Rochester Township
- Mayowood Lake: Rochester Township
- Silver Lake: Haverhill Township and Cascade Township
- Lake Zumbro (part): Oronoco Township

== Demographics ==
Historical population
| Census | Pop. | Note | %± |
|---|---|---|---|
| 1860 | 9,524 | | — |
| 1870 | 19,793 | | 107.8% |
| 1880 | 21,543 | | 8.8% |
| 1890 | 19,806 | | −8.1% |
| 1900 | 23,119 | | 16.7% |
| 1910 | 22,497 | | −2.7% |
| 1920 | 28,014 | | 24.5% |
| 1930 | 35,426 | | 26.5% |
| 1940 | 42,658 | | 20.4% |
| 1950 | 48,228 | | 13.1% |
| 1960 | 65,532 | | 35.9% |
| 1970 | 84,104 | | 28.3% |
| 1980 | 92,006 | | 9.4% |
| 1990 | 106,470 | | 15.7% |
| 2000 | 124,277 | | 16.7% |
| 2010 | 144,248 | | 16.1% |
| 2020 | 162,847 | | 12.9% |
| 2025 (est.) | 166,731 | ▲ | 2.4% |
U.S. Decennial Census; 1790–1960 1900–1990; 1990–2000 2010–2020

As of the second quarter of 2025, the median home value in Olmsted County was $380,616.

According to realtor website Zillow, the average price of a home as of November 30, 2025, in Olmsted County is $337,521.

As of the 2024 American Community Survey, there are 67,723 estimated households in Olmsted County with an average of 2.41 persons per household. The county has a median household income of $92,942. Approximately 5.9% of the county's population lives at or below the poverty line. Olmsted County has an estimated 69.6% employment rate, with 51.6% of the population holding a bachelor's degree or higher and 95.7% holding a high school diploma. There were 73,143 housing units at an average density of 111.92 per square mile (43.2/km^{2}).

The top five reported languages (people were allowed to report up to two languages, thus the figures will generally add to more than 100%) were English (88.5%), Spanish (3.1%), Indo-European (2.6%), Asian and Pacific Islander (3.5%), and Other (2.3%).

=== Racial and ethnic composition ===
Olmsted County, Minnesota – racial and ethnic composition Note: the US Census treats Hispanic/Latino as an ethnic category. This table excludes Latinos from the racial categories and assigns them to a separate category. Hispanics/Latinos may be of any race.
| Race / ethnicity (NH = non-Hispanic) | Pop. 1980 | Pop. 1990 | Pop. 2000 | Pop. 2010 | Pop. 2020 |
|---|---|---|---|---|---|
| White alone (NH) | 89,806 (97.61%) | 101,255 (95.10%) | 110,598 (88.99%) | 120,348 (83.43%) | 124,758 (76.61%) |
| Black or African American alone (NH) | 404 (0.44%) | 767 (0.72%) | 3,293 (2.65%) | 6,751 (4.68%) | 10,959 (6.73%) |
| Native American or Alaska Native alone (NH) | 130 (0.14%) | 280 (0.26%) | 286 (0.23%) | 297 (0.21%) | 380 (0.23%) |
| Asian alone (NH) | 983 (1.07%) | 3,157 (2.97%) | 5,270 (4.24%) | 7,771 (5.39%) | 10,190 (6.26%) |
| Pacific Islander alone (NH) | — | — | 39 (0.03%) | 57 (0.04%) | 66 (0.04%) |
| Other race alone (NH) | 151 (0.16%) | 41 (0.04%) | 137 (0.11%) | 246 (0.17%) | 548 (0.34%) |
| Mixed-race or multiracial (NH) | — | — | 1,695 (1.36%) | 2,697 (1.87%) | 6,750 (4.14%) |
| Hispanic or Latino (any race) | 532 (0.58%) | 970 (0.91%) | 2,959 (2.38%) | 6,081 (4.22%) | 9,196 (5.65%) |
| Total | 92,006 (100.00%) | 106,470 (100.00%) | 124,277 (100.00%) | 144,248 (100.00%) | 162,847 (100.00%) |

=== 2024 estimate ===
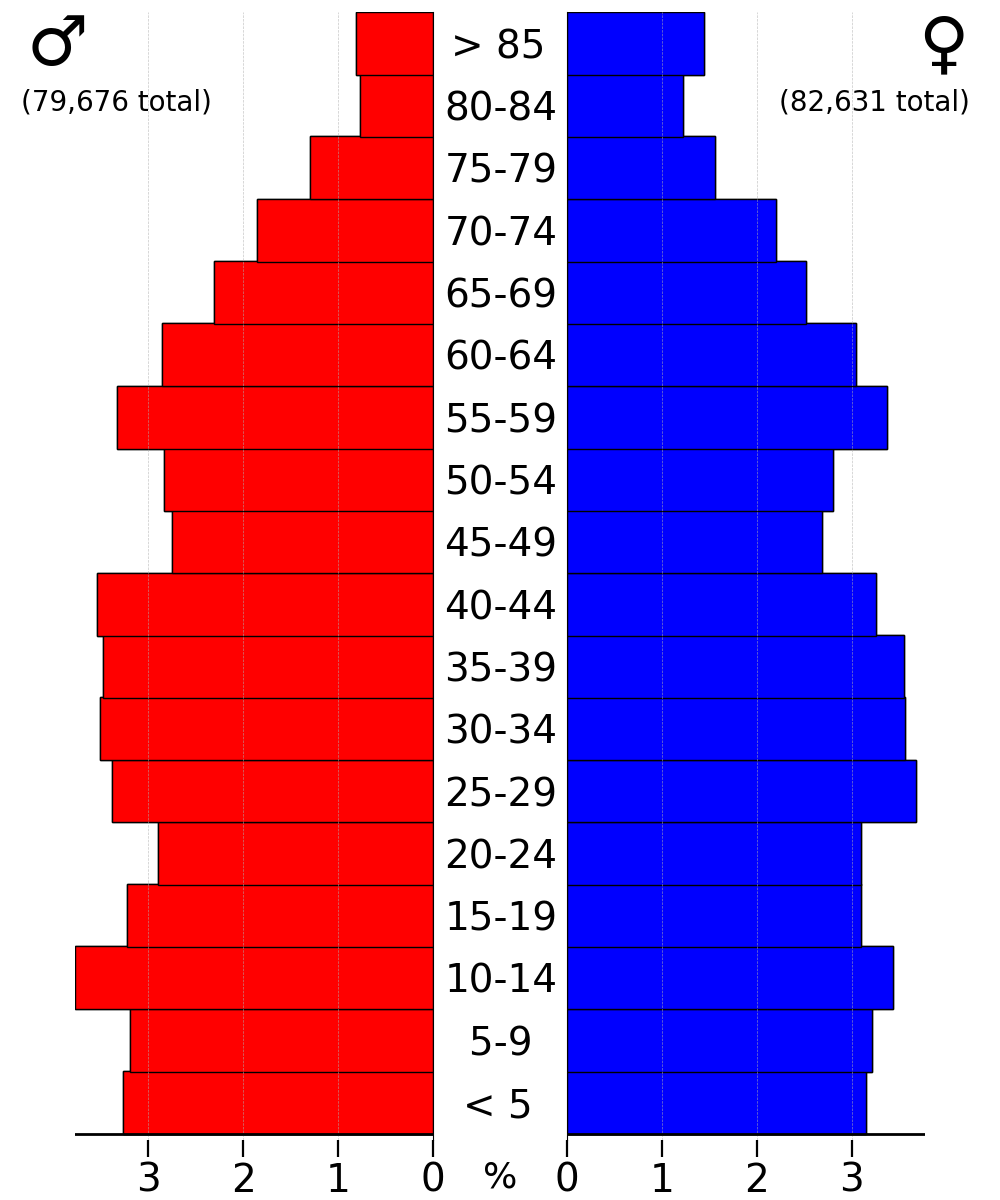
2022 US Census population pyramid for Olmsted County, from ACS 5-year estimates

As of the 2024 estimate, there were 166,424 people and 67,723 households residing in the county. The population density was 254.66 inhabitants per square mile (98.3/km^{2}). There were 73,143 housing units at an average density of 111.92 per square mile (43.2/km^{2}). The racial makeup of the county was 80.8% White (75.4% NH White), 8.6% African American, 0.5% Native American, 7.1% Asian, 0.1% Pacific Islander, _% from some other races and 2.9% from two or more races. Hispanic or Latino people of any race were 6.3% of the population.

=== 2020 census ===
As of the 2020 census, the county had a population of 162,847. The median age was 37.1 years. 23.7% of residents were under the age of 18 and 15.9% of residents were 65 years of age or older. For every 100 females there were 95.5 males, and for every 100 females age 18 and over there were 92.7 males age 18 and over.

The racial makeup of the county was 77.8% White, 6.8% Black or African American, 0.4% American Indian and Alaska Native, 6.3% Asian, 0.1% Native Hawaiian and Pacific Islander, 2.5% from some other race, and 6.1% from two or more races. Hispanic or Latino residents of any race comprised 5.6% of the population.

82.6% of residents lived in urban areas, while 17.4% lived in rural areas.

There were 65,242 households in the county, of which 29.9% had children under the age of 18 living in them. Of all households, 50.0% were married-couple households, 16.9% were households with a male householder and no spouse or partner present, and 26.2% were households with a female householder and no spouse or partner present. About 29.2% of all households were made up of individuals and 10.0% had someone living alone who was 65 years of age or older.

There were 69,270 housing units, of which 5.8% were vacant. Among occupied housing units, 70.0% were owner-occupied and 30.0% were renter-occupied. The homeowner vacancy rate was 1.0% and the rental vacancy rate was 9.0%.

=== 2010 census ===
As of the 2010 census, there were 144,248 people, 57,084 households, and _ families residing in the county. The population density was 220.78 inhabitants per square mile (85.2/km^{2}). There were 60,501 housing units at an average density of 92.60 per square mile (35.8/km^{2}). The racial makeup of the county was 85.70% White, 4.76% African American, 0.24% Native American, 5.41% Asian, 0.05% Pacific Islander, 1.64% from some other races and 2.21% from two or more races. Hispanic or Latino people of any race were 4.22% of the population.

=== 2000 census ===
As of the 2000 census, there were 124,277 people, 47,807 households, and 32,317 families residing in the county. The population density was 190.0 inhabitants per square mile (73.4/km^{2}). There were 49,422 housing units at an average density of 75.7 per square mile (29.2/km^{2}). The racial makeup of the county was 90.33% White, 2.68% African American, 0.26% Native American, 4.27% Asian, 0.03% Pacific Islander, 0.92% from some other races and 1.51% from two or more races. Hispanic or Latino people of any race were 2.38% of the population.

There were 47,807 households, out of which 35.20% had children under the age of 18 living with them, 56.70% were married couples living together, 8.00% had a female householder with no husband present, and 32.40% were non-families. 25.80% of all households were made up of individuals, and 7.60% had someone living alone who was 65 years of age or older. The average household size was 2.53 and the average family size was 3.09.

The county population contained 27.00% under the age of 18, 8.50% from 18 to 24, 32.20% from 25 to 44, 21.60% from 45 to 64, and 10.80% who were 65 years of age or older. The median age was 35 years. For every 100 females, there were 96.60 males. For every 100 females age 18 and over, there were 93.60 males.

The median income for a household in the county was $51,316, and the median income for a family was $61,610. Males had a median income of $40,196 versus $29,994 for females. The per capita income for the county was $24,939. About 3.80% of families and 6.40% of the population were below the poverty line, including 6.70% of those under age 18 and 9.50% of those age 65 or over.

== Politics ==
Olmsted has historically been a Republican-leaning county, but rapid population growth in Rochester has made it more competitive in recent years. In 2020, Joe Biden won it by nearly 11 points, the best performance of any Democratic presidential nominee since Lyndon Johnson in 1964.

Although it has trended Democratic at the presidential level, Olmsted County continues to lean Republican in state and local races, with split ticket voting becoming more common. Two of the county's three seats in the Minnesota Senate are held by Republicans, as are two of the five seats in the Minnesota House of Representatives. Since 1970, Olmsted County has voted for the DFL nominee for governor thrice: in 1974, 2018, and 2022. In 2018, then-Representative Tim Walz benefitted from high recognition in the district with a reputation at the time as a moderate. Republican nominee Doug Wardlow concurrently won the greatest number of votes in Olmsted County in the 2018 Minnesota Attorney General election.

=== US House of Representatives ===
| Name | Congressional District | Assumed office | Party |
|---|---|---|---|
| Brad Finstad | 1st District | 2022 | Republican |

=== Minnesota Senate ===
| Name | District | Assumed office | Party |
|---|---|---|---|
| Steve Drazkowski | District 20 | 2023 | Republican |
| Carla Nelson | District 24 | 2011 | Republican |
| Liz Boldon | District 25 | 2023 | DFL |

=== Minnesota House of Representatives ===
| Name | District | Assumed office | Party |
|---|---|---|---|
| Steve Jacob | District 20A | 2023 | Republican |
| Duane Quam | District 24A | 2011 | Republican |
| Tina Liebling | District 24B | 2005 | DFL |
| Kim Hicks | District 25A | 2023 | DFL |
| Andy Smith | District 25B | 2023 | DFL |

United States presidential election results for Olmsted County, Minnesota
| Year | Republican | | Democratic | | Third party(ies) | |
| Year | No. | % | No. | % | No. | % |
|---|---|---|---|---|---|---|
| 1892 | 2,344 | 50.79% | 1,931 | 41.84% | 340 | 7.37% |
| 1896 | 3,201 | 62.83% | 1,741 | 34.17% | 153 | 3.00% |
| 1900 | 2,818 | 61.62% | 1,597 | 34.92% | 158 | 3.46% |
| 1904 | 2,745 | 68.54% | 1,140 | 28.46% | 120 | 3.00% |
| 1908 | 2,472 | 58.03% | 1,621 | 38.05% | 167 | 3.92% |
| 1912 | 720 | 18.21% | 1,542 | 39.01% | 1,691 | 42.78% |
| 1916 | 2,101 | 49.67% | 1,926 | 45.53% | 203 | 4.80% |
| 1920 | 7,130 | 77.12% | 1,756 | 18.99% | 359 | 3.88% |
| 1924 | 5,722 | 56.50% | 857 | 8.46% | 3,548 | 35.04% |
| 1928 | 8,334 | 63.63% | 4,720 | 36.04% | 44 | 0.34% |
| 1932 | 5,254 | 40.81% | 7,340 | 57.01% | 280 | 2.17% |
| 1936 | 5,316 | 35.63% | 8,958 | 60.04% | 645 | 4.32% |
| 1940 | 9,096 | 51.83% | 8,393 | 47.82% | 62 | 0.35% |
| 1944 | 8,355 | 54.70% | 6,873 | 45.00% | 46 | 0.30% |
| 1948 | 8,131 | 46.55% | 9,155 | 52.41% | 181 | 1.04% |
| 1952 | 14,566 | 67.92% | 6,792 | 31.67% | 89 | 0.41% |
| 1956 | 13,789 | 65.62% | 7,172 | 34.13% | 51 | 0.24% |
| 1960 | 16,080 | 59.41% | 10,918 | 40.34% | 67 | 0.25% |
| 1964 | 12,699 | 43.87% | 16,195 | 55.94% | 56 | 0.19% |
| 1968 | 17,292 | 54.31% | 13,417 | 42.14% | 1,131 | 3.55% |
| 1972 | 23,806 | 68.96% | 9,817 | 28.44% | 898 | 2.60% |
| 1976 | 24,030 | 60.66% | 14,676 | 37.04% | 911 | 2.30% |
| 1980 | 22,704 | 55.50% | 13,983 | 34.18% | 4,224 | 10.32% |
| 1984 | 28,129 | 62.76% | 16,335 | 36.44% | 359 | 0.80% |
| 1988 | 27,683 | 58.28% | 19,423 | 40.89% | 398 | 0.84% |
| 1992 | 23,404 | 41.30% | 19,039 | 33.60% | 14,219 | 25.09% |
| 1996 | 22,860 | 43.92% | 22,857 | 43.92% | 6,327 | 12.16% |
| 2000 | 30,641 | 51.59% | 25,822 | 43.48% | 2,929 | 4.93% |
| 2004 | 37,371 | 52.21% | 33,285 | 46.50% | 919 | 1.28% |
| 2008 | 36,202 | 47.34% | 38,711 | 50.62% | 1,557 | 2.04% |
| 2012 | 36,832 | 47.03% | 39,338 | 50.23% | 2,146 | 2.74% |
| 2016 | 35,668 | 44.51% | 36,268 | 45.26% | 8,193 | 10.22% |
| 2020 | 39,692 | 43.43% | 49,491 | 54.16% | 2,202 | 2.41% |
| 2024 | 39,467 | 43.41% | 49,121 | 54.02% | 2,336 | 2.57% |

== Education ==
K-12 school districts include:

- Plainview-Elgin-Millville Public Schools (ISD #2899) – partial
- Byron Public Schools (ISD #531)
- Chatfield Public Schools (ISD #227)
- Dover-Eyota Public Schools (ISD #533)
- Hayfield Public Schools (ISD #203) – partial
- Kasson-Mantorville Public Schools (ISD #204) – partial
- Pine Island Public Schools (ISD #255) – partial
- Rochester Public Schools (ISD #535)
- St. Charles Public Schools (ISD #858) – partial
- Stewartville Public Schools (ISD #534)
- Zumbrota-Mazeppa Public Schools (ISD #2805) – partial

== Communities ==
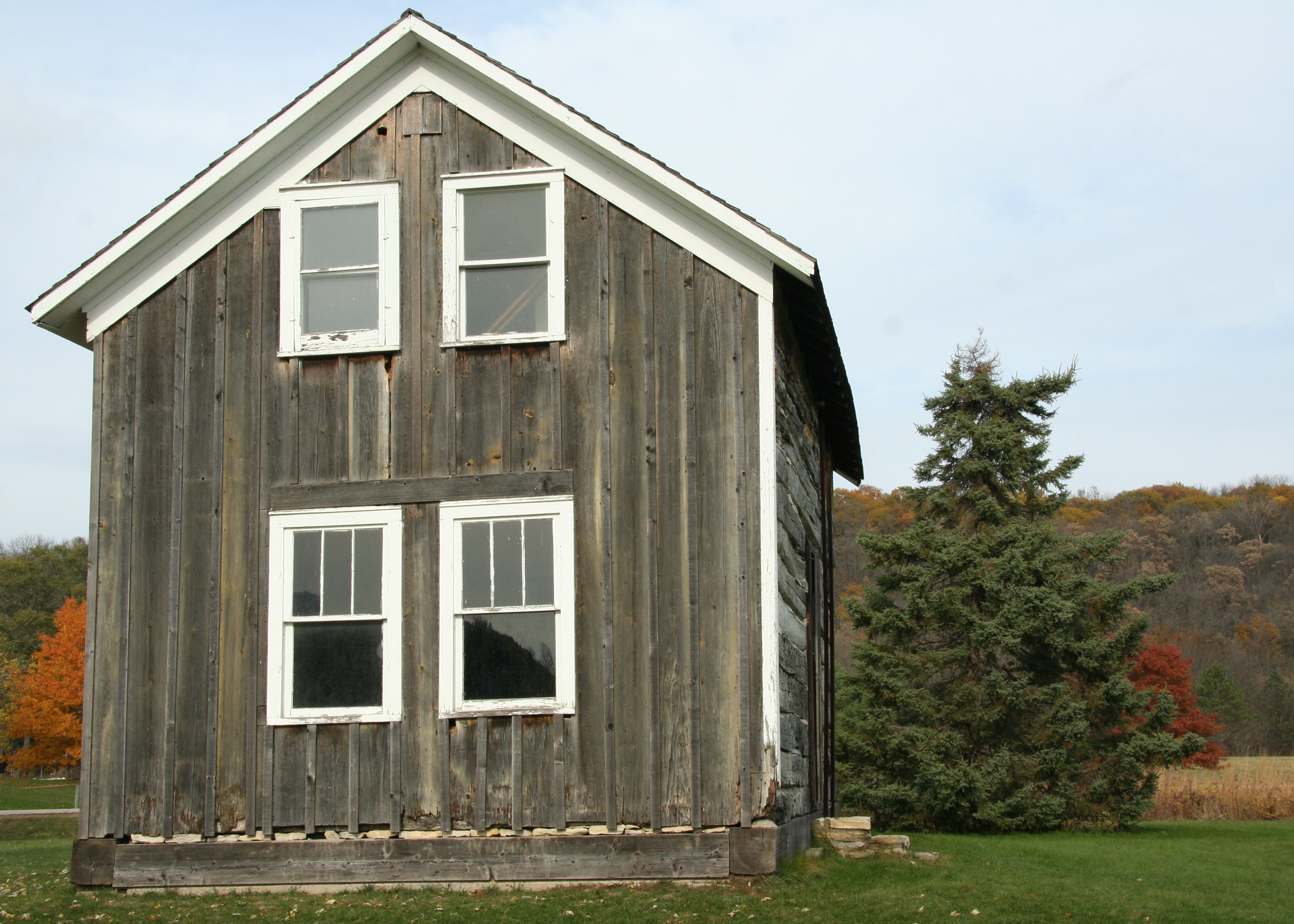
The Helleckson Homestead, built about 1850, preserved in Olmsted County Oxbow Park (destroyed in 2019 floods)

=== Cities ===
- Byron
- Chatfield (part)
- Dover
- Eyota
- Oronoco
- Pine Island (part)
- Rochester (county seat)
- Stewartville

=== Census-designated place ===
- High Forest
- Marion

=== Unincorporated communities ===
- Chester
- Cummingsville
- Danesville (part)
- Douglas
- Genoa
- Judge
- Pleasant Grove
- Post Town
- Potsdam
- Predmore
- Ringe
- Rock Dell
- Salem Corners
- Shanty Town
- Simpson
- Viola

=== Townships ===
- Cascade Township
- Dover Township
- Elmira Township
- Eyota Township
- Farmington Township
- Haverhill Township
- High Forest Township
- Kalmar Township
- Marion Township
- New Haven Township
- Orion Township
- Oronoco Township
- Pleasant Grove Township
- Quincy Township
- Rochester Township
- Rock Dell Township
- Salem Township
- Viola Township

== See also ==
- National Register of Historic Places listings in Olmsted County, Minnesota
