= Cummingsville, Minnesota =

Cummingsville
- Unincorporated community
- Location within Minnesota Location within the United States
- Coordinates: 43°52′29″N 92°15′37″W
- Country: United States
- State: Minnesota
- County: Olmsted
- Elevation: 1,014 ft (309 m)
- Time zone: UTC-6 (Central (CST))
  - Summer (DST): UTC-5 (CDT)
- Area code: 507
- GNIS feature ID: 654659

Cummingsville is an unincorporated community in Olmsted County, in the U.S. state of Minnesota.

== History ==
The community was named for its founder, Francis H. Cummings. It was founded in 1855, and at the time featured a sawmill alongside the Root River. By 1920, it was regarded as a former village.
