= Judge, Minnesota =

Judge
- Unincorporated community
- Location within Minnesota Location within the United States
- Coordinates: 43°53′57″N 92°28′34″W
- Country: United States
- State: Minnesota
- County: Olmsted
- Elevation: 1,289 ft (393 m)
- Time zone: UTC-6 (Central (CST))
  - Summer (DST): UTC-5 (CDT)
- Area code: 507
- GNIS feature ID: 654771

Judge is an unincorporated community in Olmsted County, in the U.S. state of Minnesota.

== History ==
A post office was established at Judge in 1897, and remained in operation until 1902. The community was named for Edward Judge, the original owner of the town site.
