= Predmore, Minnesota =

Predmore
- Unincorporated community
- Location within Minnesota Location within the United States
- Coordinates: 43°56′17″N 92°19′44″W
- Country: United States
- State: Minnesota
- County: Olmsted
- Elevation: 1,234 ft (376 m)
- Time zone: UTC-6 (Central (CST))
  - Summer (DST): UTC-5 (CDT)
- Area code: 507
- GNIS feature ID: 649723

Predmore is an unincorporated community in Olmsted County, in the U.S. state of Minnesota.

== History ==
Predmore was laid out in 1891, and named for J. W. Predmore, an early settler. A post office was established at Predmore in 1892, and remained in operation until 1905.
