= Salem Corners, Minnesota =

Salem Corners
- Unincorporated community
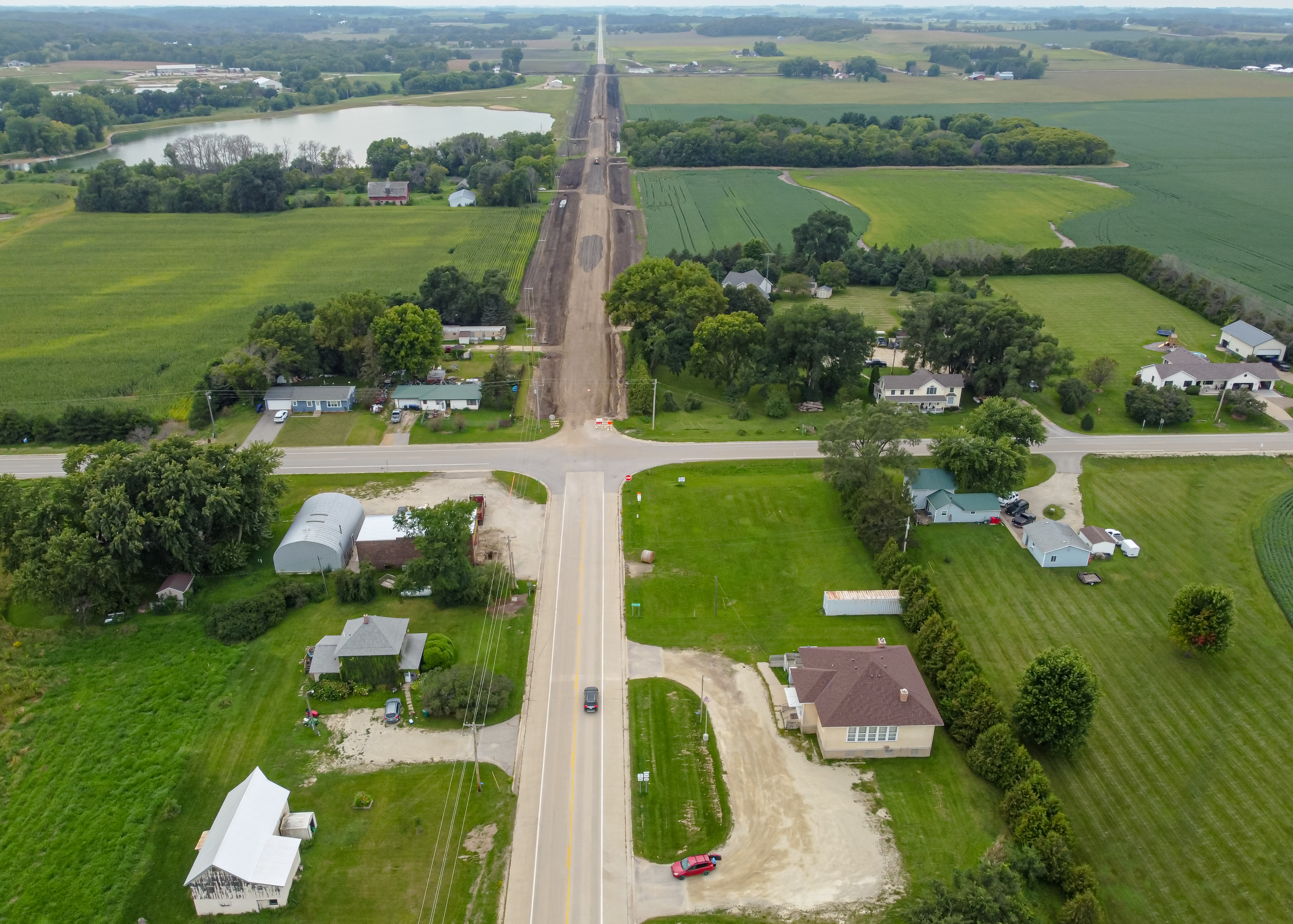

- Location within Minnesota Location within the United States
- Coordinates: 43°59′09″N 92°36′29″W
- Country: United States
- State: Minnesota
- County: Olmsted
- Township: Salem Township
- Elevation: 1,076 ft (328 m)
- Time zone: UTC-6 (Central (CST))
  - Summer (DST): UTC-5 (CDT)
- ZIP code: 55920
- Area code: 507
- GNIS feature ID: 651111

Salem Corners is an unincorporated community in Salem Township, Olmsted County, Minnesota, United States, near Byron. The community is located near the junction of Olmsted County Roads 3 and 25.
