= High Forest, Minnesota =

High Forest
- Unincorporated community and Census designated place
- Location within Minnesota Location within the United States
- Coordinates: 43°50′46″N 92°32′59″W
- Country: United States
- State: Minnesota
- County: Olmsted
- Township: High Forest Township

Area
  - Total: 0.33 sq mi (0.85 km^{2})
  - Land: 0.33 sq mi (0.85 km^{2})
  - Water: 0 sq mi (0.00 km^{2})
- Elevation: 1,240 ft (380 m)

Population (2020)
  - Total: 126
  - Density: 386.1/sq mi (149.07/km^{2})
- Time zone: UTC-6 (Central (CST))
  - Summer (DST): UTC-5 (CDT)
- ZIP code: 55976
- Area code: 507
- GNIS feature ID: 2806362

High Forest is an unincorporated community in High Forest Township, Olmsted County, Minnesota, United States, near Rochester and Stewartville. As of the 2020 census, High Forest had a population of 126. The community is located near the junction of Olmsted County Roads 6 and 8, and Covill Street SW.

== History ==
High Forest was platted in 1855, and named for the forests near the original town site. A post office was established at High Forest in 1856, and remained in operation until 1902.

Historical population
Census	Pop.	Note	%±
1870	249		—
1880	180		−27.7%
1890	163		−9.4%
1900	139		−14.7%
1910	127		−8.6%
2020	126		—
U.S. Decennial Census
