= Rochester Township, Olmsted County, Minnesota =

Rochester Township, Minnesota
- Township
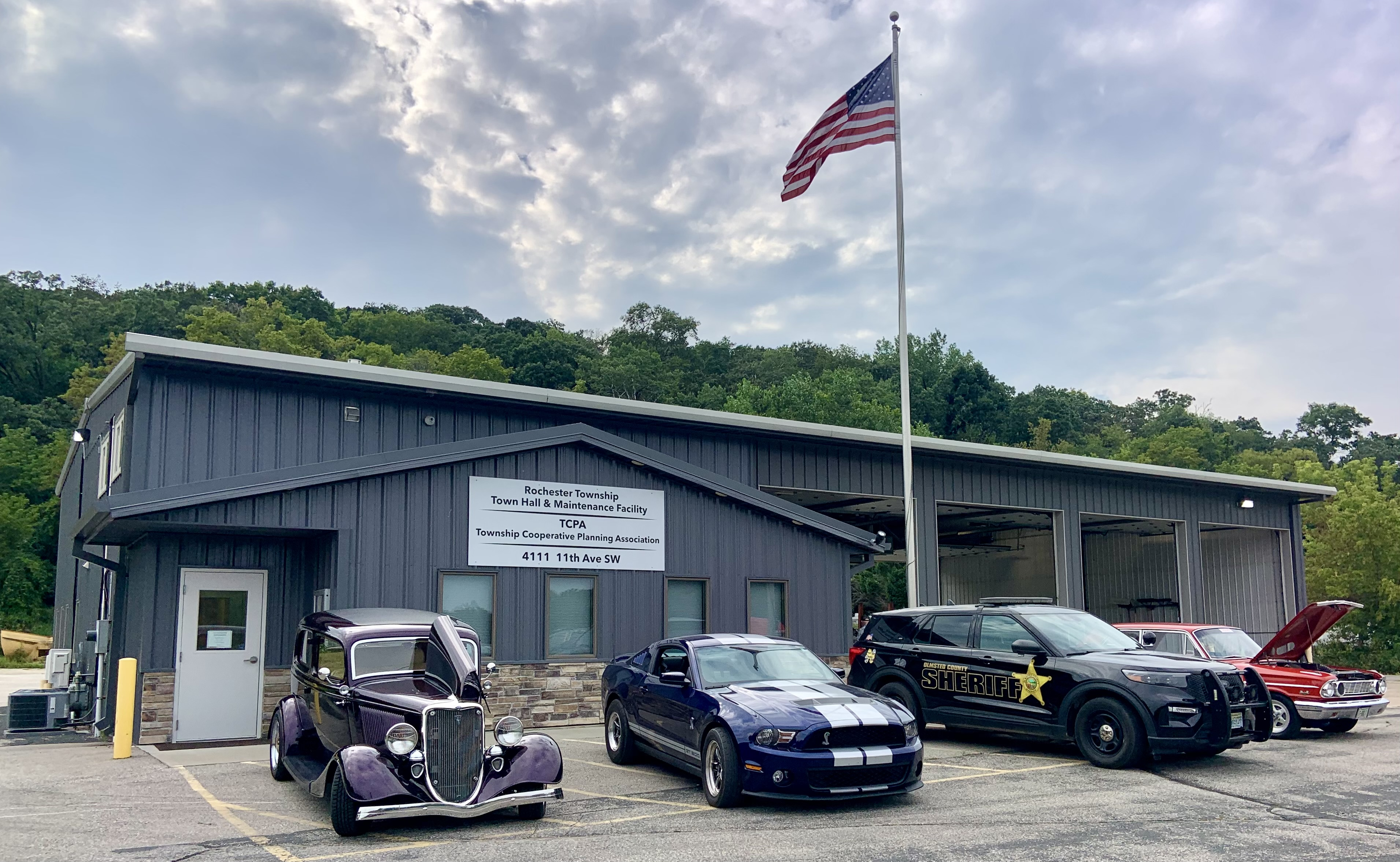
- Town hall

- Location within the state of Minnesota Rochester Township, Minnesota (the United States)
- Coordinates: 43°59′6″N 92°29′35″W
- Country: United States
- State: Minnesota
- County: Olmsted

Area
  - Total: 22.4 sq mi (57.9 km^{2})
  - Land: 22.3 sq mi (57.8 km^{2})
  - Water: 0.039 sq mi (0.1 km^{2})
- Elevation: 1,178 ft (359 m)

Population (2000)
  - Total: 2,916
  - Density: 131/sq mi (50.5/km^{2})
- Time zone: UTC-6 (Central (CST))
  - Summer (DST): UTC-5 (CDT)
- ZIP codes: 55901-55906
- Area code: 507
- FIPS code: 27-54898
- GNIS feature ID: 0665431
- Website: https://www.rochestertownshipmn.gov/

Rochester Township is a township in Olmsted County, Minnesota, United States. The population was 2,916 at the 2000 census.

== Geography ==
According to the United States Census Bureau, the township has a total area of 22.3 square miles (57.9 km^{2}), of which 22.3 square miles (57.8 km^{2}) is land and 0.04 square mile (0.1 km^{2}) (0.09%) is water.

== Demographics ==
As of the census of 2000, there were 2,916 people, 1,006 households, and 872 families residing in the township. The population density was 130.7 inhabitants per square mile (50.5/km^{2}). There were 1,024 housing units at an average density of 45.9 per square mile (17.7/km^{2}). The racial makeup of the township was 95.82% White, 1.13% African American, 0.24% Native American, 1.68% Asian, 0.14% from other races, and 0.99% from two or more races. Hispanic or Latino of any race were 1.20% of the population.

There were 1,006 households, out of which 40.9% had children under the age of 18 living with them, 81.5% were married couples living together, 3.3% had a female householder with no husband present, and 13.3% were non-families. 10.9% of all households were made up of individuals, and 4.8% had someone living alone who was 65 years of age or older. The average household size was 2.86 and the average family size was 3.09.

In the township the population was spread out, with 28.8% under the age of 18, 4.3% from 18 to 24, 23.4% from 25 to 44, 32.0% from 45 to 64, and 11.6% who were 65 years of age or older. The median age was 42 years. For every 100 females, there were 100.6 males. For every 100 females age 18 and over, there were 99.3 males.

The median income for a household in the township was $81,789, and the median income for a family was $88,979. Males had a median income of $62,679 versus $35,833 for females. The per capita income for the township was $39,377. None of the families and 0.9% of the population were living below the poverty line, including no under eighteens and 4.8% of those over 64.
