= High Forest Township, Olmsted County, Minnesota =

High Forest Township, Minnesota
- Township
- Location within the state of Minnesota High Forest Township, Minnesota (the United States)
- Coordinates: 43°51′59″N 92°32′2″W
- Country: United States
- State: Minnesota
- County: Olmsted

Area
  - Total: 41.4 sq mi (107.3 km^{2})
  - Land: 41.4 sq mi (107.1 km^{2})
  - Water: 0.077 sq mi (0.2 km^{2})
- Elevation: 1,299 ft (396 m)

Population (2000)
  - Total: 1,085
  - Density: 26/sq mi (10.1/km^{2})
- Time zone: UTC-6 (Central (CST))
  - Summer (DST): UTC-5 (CDT)
- ZIP code: 55976
- Area code: 507
- FIPS code: 27-28880
- GNIS feature ID: 0664468

High Forest Township is a township in Olmsted County, Minnesota, United States. The population was 1,085 at the 2000 census. It contains the census-designated place of High Forest.

High Forest Township was organized in 1858.

== Geography ==
According to the United States Census Bureau, the township has a total area of 41.4 square miles (107 km^{2}), of which 41.4 square miles (107 km^{2}) is land and 0.1 square miles (0.26 km^{2}) (0.19%) is water.

== Demographics ==
As of the census of 2000, there were 1,085 people, 377 households, and 317 families residing in the township. The population density was 26.2 inhabitants per square mile (10.1/km^{2}). There were 384 housing units at an average density of 9.3 per square mile (3.6/km^{2}). The racial makeup of the township was 99.35% White, 0.18% Asian, 0.09% from other races, and 0.37% from two or more races. Hispanic or Latino of any race were 1.11% of the population.

There were 377 households, out of which 39.5% had children under the age of 18 living with them, 75.3% were married couples living together, 3.7% had a female householder with no husband present, and 15.9% were non-families. 12.7% of all households were made up of individuals, and 5.6% had someone living alone who was 65 years of age or older. The average household size was 2.88 and the average family size was 3.14.

In the township the population was spread out, with 30.0% under the age of 18, 5.3% from 18 to 24, 28.9% from 25 to 44, 26.7% from 45 to 64, and 9.1% who were 65 years of age or older. The median age was 38 years. For every 100 females, there were 105.5 males. For every 100 females age 18 and over, there were 107.1 males.

The median income for a household in the township was $56,818, and the median income for a family was $58,750. Males had a median income of $38,929 versus $27,188 for females. The per capita income for the township was $22,524. About 2.4% of families and 5.2% of the population were below the poverty line, including 5.7% of those under age 18 and 8.7% of those age 65 or over.

== Notable residents ==
Prolific film and television character actor William Fawcett (1894-1974) grew up in High Forest Township and is interred with his wife, Helene, in Roselawn Cemetery in Roseville, Minnesota.
