= Elmira Township, Olmsted County, Minnesota =

Elmira Township, Minnesota
- Township
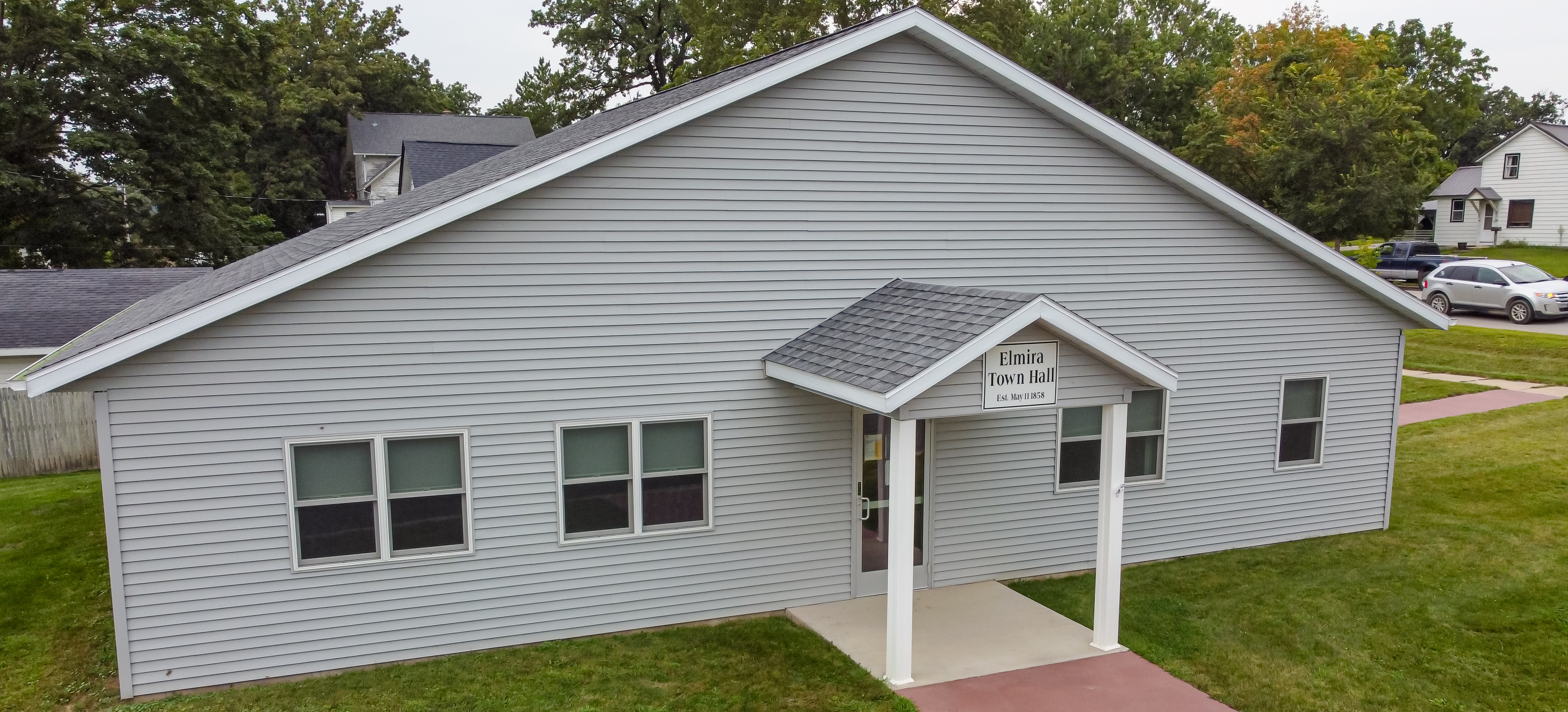
- Town hall in Chatfield

- Location within Minnesota
- Coordinates: 43°52′59″N 92°9′13″W
- Country: United States
- State: Minnesota
- County: Olmsted

Area
  - Total: 35.0 sq mi (90.7 km^{2})
  - Land: 35.0 sq mi (90.7 km^{2})
  - Water: 0 sq mi (0.0 km^{2})
- Elevation: 1,120 ft (340 m)

Population (2000)
  - Total: 352
  - Density: 10/sq mi (3.9/km^{2})
- Time zone: UTC-6 (Central (CST))
  - Summer (DST): UTC-5 (CDT)
- FIPS code: 27-18962
- GNIS feature ID: 0664084

Elmira Township is a township in Olmsted County, Minnesota, United States. The population was 352 at the 2000 census.

Elmira Township was organized in 1858, and named after Elmira, New York, the native home of a share of the early settlers.

== Geography ==
According to the United States Census Bureau, the township has a total area of 35.0 mi^{2} (90.6 km^{2}), all land.

== Demographics ==
As of the census of 2000, there were 352 people, 119 households, and 98 families residing in the township. The population density was 10.1/mi^{2} (3.9/km^{2}). There were 123 housing units at an average density of 3.5/mi^{2} (1.4/km^{2}). The racial makeup of the township was 100.00% White.

There were 119 households, out of which 42.9% had children under the age of 18 living with them, 73.9% were married couples living together, 2.5% had a female householder with no husband present, and 17.6% were non-families. 16.0% of all households were made up of individuals, and 7.6% had someone living alone who was 65 years of age or older. The average household size was 2.96 and the average family size was 3.32.

In the township the population was spread out, with 30.7% under the age of 18, 6.3% from 18 to 24, 28.7% from 25 to 44, 20.7% from 45 to 64, and 13.6% who were 65 years of age or older. The median age was 38 years. For every 100 females, there were 118.6 males. For every 100 females age 18 and over, there were 114.0 males.

The median income for a household in the township was $65,156, and the median income for a family was $69,375. Males had a median income of $36,250 versus $30,625 for females. The per capita income for the township was $23,243. None of the families and 1.7% of the population were living below the poverty line, including no under eighteens and 3.8% of those over 64.
