= Plainview, Minnesota =

City in Minnesota, United States

Plainview
- City
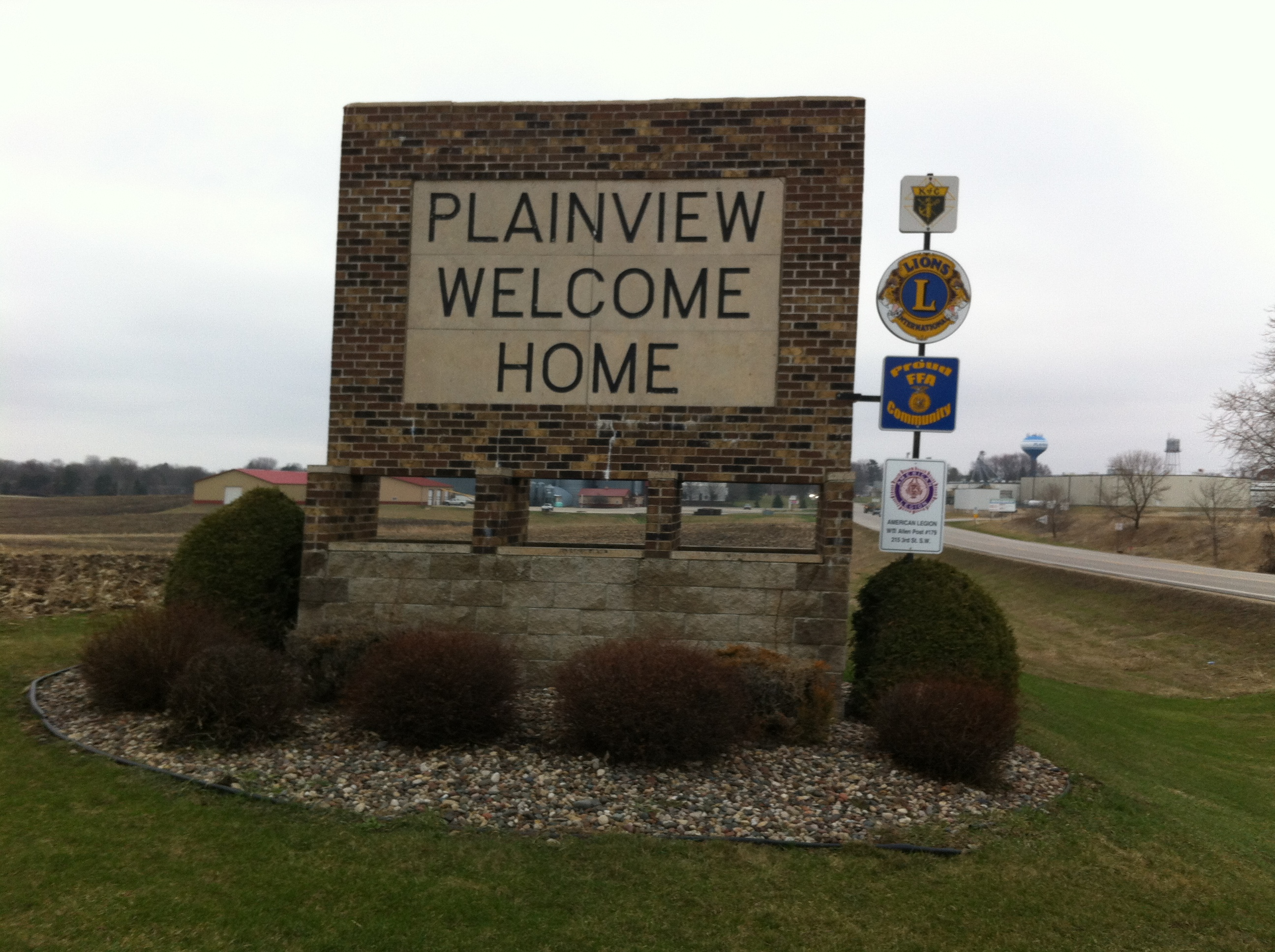
- Plainview's town sign

- Location of Plainview, Minnesota
- Coordinates: 44°9′52″N 92°10′9″W
- Country: United States
- State: Minnesota
- County: Wabasha

Area
  - Total: 2.14 sq mi (5.55 km^{2})
  - Land: 2.14 sq mi (5.55 km^{2})
  - Water: 0 sq mi (0.00 km^{2})
- Elevation: 1,161 ft (354 m)

Population (2020)
  - Total: 3,483
  - Density: 1,626.4/sq mi (627.95/km^{2})
- Time zone: UTC-6 (Central (CST))
  - Summer (DST): UTC-5 (CDT)
- ZIP code: 55964
- Area code: 507
- FIPS code: 27-51424
- GNIS feature ID: 0649536
- Website: www.plainviewmn.com

Plainview is a city in Wabasha County, Minnesota, United States. The population was 3,483 at the 2020 census, up from 3,340 at the 2010 census. The author Jon Hassler was raised in Plainview and some of the places in his writing are based on the town.

== History ==
Plainview was platted in 1857. The city was named from its location on a plain at a lofty elevation, where a "plain view" can be had of the surrounding area. A post office has been in operation at Plainview since 1857. Plainview was incorporated in 1875.

== Geography ==
According to the United States Census Bureau, the city has a total area of 2.16 square miles (5.59 km^{2}), all of it land.

Minnesota Highway 42, Minnesota Highway 247, and County Highway 4 are three of the main routes in the city.

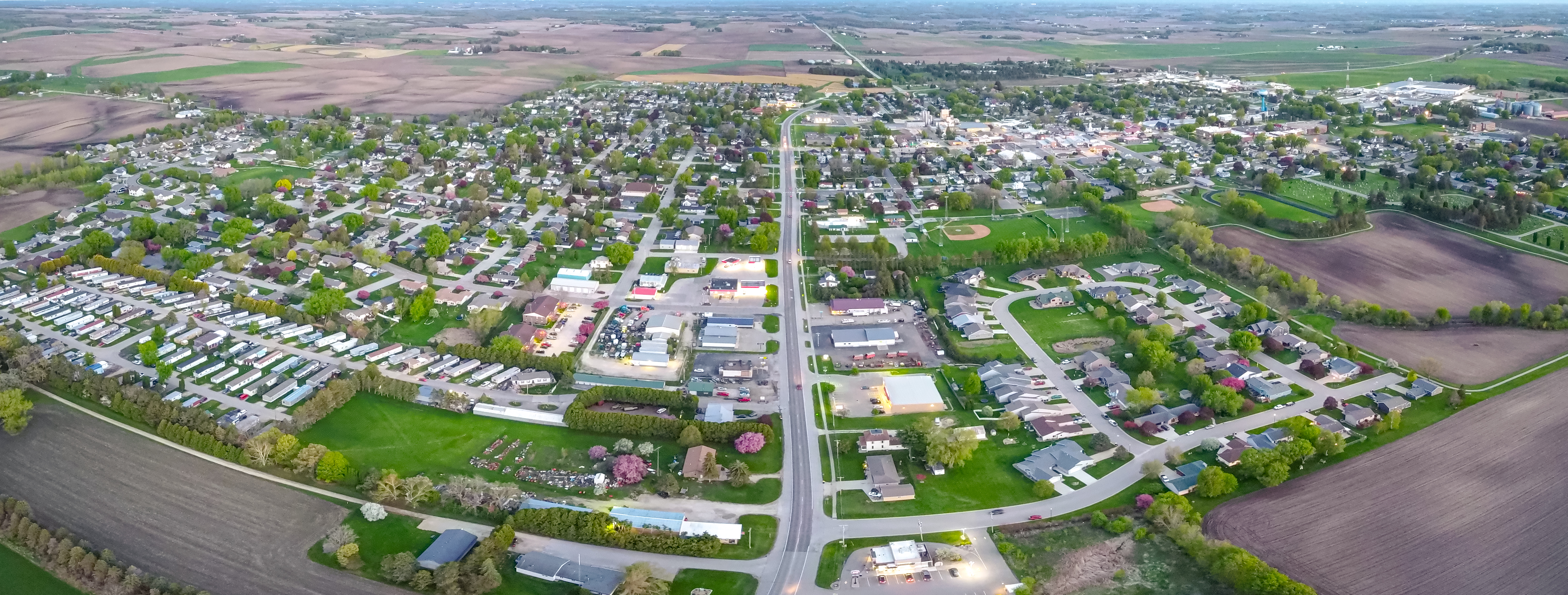
MN-42 runs through town

== Demographics ==
Historical population
Census	Pop.	Note	%±
1870	637		—
1880	668		4.9%
1900	1,088		—
1910	1,175		8.0%
1920	1,370		16.6%
1930	1,233		−10.0%
1940	1,500		21.7%
1950	1,524		1.6%
1960	1,833		20.3%
1970	2,093		14.2%
1980	2,416		15.4%
1990	2,768		14.6%
2000	3,190		15.2%
2010	3,340		4.7%
2020	3,483		4.3%
U.S. Decennial Census

=== 2020 census ===
As of the 2020 census, Plainview had a population of 3,483. The median age was 36.3 years. 28.4% of residents were under the age of 18 and 16.0% of residents were 65 years of age or older. For every 100 females there were 93.8 males, and for every 100 females age 18 and over there were 91.4 males age 18 and over.

0.0% of residents lived in urban areas, while 100.0% lived in rural areas.

There were 1,320 households in Plainview, of which 37.7% had children under the age of 18 living in them. Of all households, 50.2% were married-couple households, 15.3% were households with a male householder and no spouse or partner present, and 25.5% were households with a female householder and no spouse or partner present. About 26.0% of all households were made up of individuals and 13.6% had someone living alone who was 65 years of age or older.

There were 1,428 housing units, of which 7.6% were vacant. The homeowner vacancy rate was 0.9% and the rental vacancy rate was 11.0%.

Racial composition as of the 2020 census
Race	Number	Percent
White	3,165	90.9%
Black or African American	22	0.6%
American Indian and Alaska Native	16	0.5%
Asian	19	0.5%
Native Hawaiian and Other Pacific Islander	0	0.0%
Some other race	57	1.6%
Two or more races	204	5.9%
Hispanic or Latino (of any race)	244	7.0%

=== 2010 census ===
As of the census of 2010, there were 3,340 people, 1,278 households, and 868 families living in the city. The population density was 1,546.3 inhabitants per square mile (597.0/km^{2}). There were 1,355 housing units at an average density of 627.3 per square mile (242.2/km^{2}). The racial makeup of the city was 94.9% White, 0.2% African American, 0.1% Native American, 0.3% Asian, 3.5% from other races, and 1.0% from two or more races. Hispanic or Latino of any race were 7.8% of the population.

There were 1,278 households, of which 36.5% had children under the age of 18 living with them, 53.1% were married couples living together, 10.4% had a female householder with no husband present, 4.5% had a male householder with no wife present, and 32.1% were non-families. 26.0% of all households were made up of individuals, and 13.8% had someone living alone who was 65 years of age or older. The average household size was 2.57 and the average family size was 3.13.

The median age in the city was 34.8 years. 27.5% of residents were under the age of 18; 7% were between the ages of 18 and 24; 28% were from 25 to 44; 22.4% were from 45 to 64; and 15.2% were 65 years of age or older. The gender makeup of the city was 48.1% male and 51.9% female.

=== 2000 census ===
As of the census of 2000, there were 3,190 people, 1,157 households, and 824 families living in the city. The population density was 1,452.5 inhabitants per square mile (560.8/km^{2}). There were 1,223 housing units at an average density of 556.9 per square mile (215.0/km^{2}). The racial makeup of the city was 96.83% White, 0.03% African American, 0.06% Native American, 0.09% Asian, 2.45% from other races, and 0.53% from two or more races. Hispanic or Latino of any race were 5.14% of the population.

There were 1,157 households, out of which 39.8% had children under the age of 18 living with them, 58.8% were married couples living together, 9.2% had a female householder with no husband present, and 28.7% were non-families. 24.0% of all households were made up of individuals, and 13.0% had someone living alone who was 65 years of age or older. The average household size was 2.65 and the average family size was 3.16.

In the city the population was spread out, with 29.3% under the age of 18, 8.6% from 18 to 24, 28.0% from 25 to 44, 17.9% from 45 to 64, and 16.2% who were 65 years of age or older. The median age was 34 years. For every 100 females, there were 93.5 males. For every 100 females age 18 and over, there were 90.0 males.

The median income for a household in the city was $39,952, and the median income for a family was $48,971. Males had a median income of $32,179 versus $22,754 for females. The per capita income for the city was $16,494. About 5.5% of families and 6.4% of the population were below the poverty line, including 4.5% of those under age 18 and 12.4% of those age 65 or over.

== Notable residents ==
- James A. Carley, Minnesota state legislator, mayor of Plainview, and lawyer
- Robert Rankin Dunlap, Minnesota state senator and lawyer
- Slim Dunlap, born in Plainview, noted guitarist for The Replacements and other bands
- Joseph Ray Watkins, was a citizen and an entrepreneur and founder of Watkins Incorporated
