= Cascade Township, Olmsted County, Minnesota =

Cascade Township, Minnesota
- Township
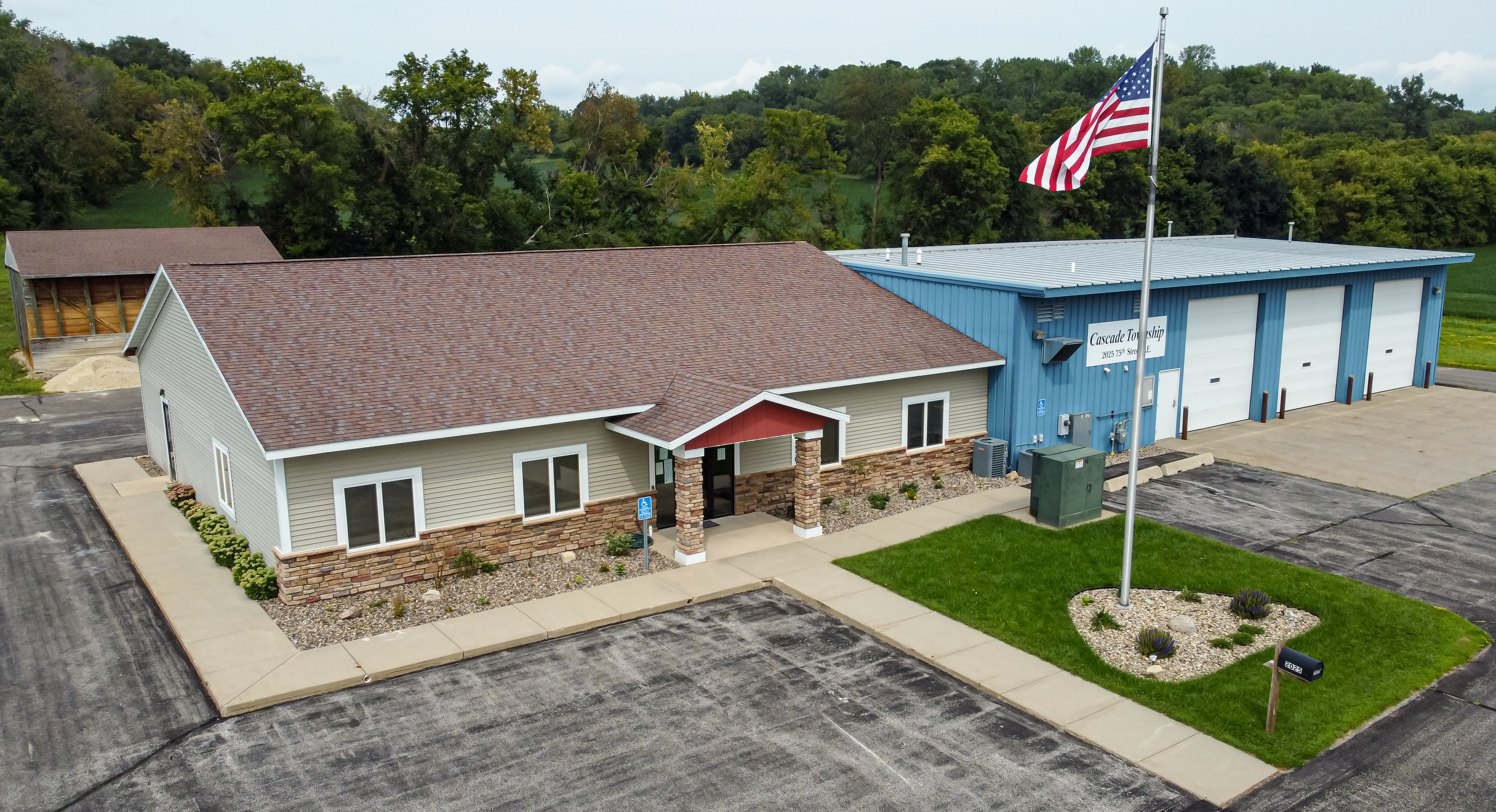
- Town hall

- Location within the state of Minnesota Cascade Township, Minnesota (the United States)
- Coordinates: 44°3′20″N 92°30′58″W
- Country: United States
- State: Minnesota
- County: Olmsted

Area
  - Total: 17.5 sq mi (45.2 km^{2})
  - Land: 17.4 sq mi (45.1 km^{2})
  - Water: 0.039 sq mi (0.1 km^{2})
- Elevation: 1,037 ft (316 m)

Population (2000)
  - Total: 3,183
  - Density: 183/sq mi (70.6/km^{2})
- Time zone: UTC-6 (Central (CST))
  - Summer (DST): UTC-5 (CDT)
- FIPS code: 27-10180
- GNIS feature ID: 0663760
- Website: cascadetownship.us

Cascade Township is a township in Olmsted County, Minnesota, United States. The population was 3,183 at the 2000 census.

Cascade Township was organized in 1859, and named after Cascade Creek.

== Geography ==
According to the United States Census Bureau, the township has a total area of 17.5 square miles (45 km^{2}), of which 17.4 square miles (45.1 km^{2}, 99.4%) is land and 0.1 square miles (0.1 km^{2}, 0.6%) is water.

== Demographics ==
As of the census of 2000, there were 3,183 people, 1,064 households, and 872 families residing in the township. The population density was 182.9 inhabitants per square mile (70.6/km^{2}). There were 1,103 housing units at an average density of 63.4 per square mile (24.5/km^{2}). The racial makeup of the township was 91.55% White, 0.31% African American, 6.50% Asian, 0.72% from other races, and 0.91% from two or more races. Hispanic or Latino of any race were 1.16% of the population.

There were 1,064 households, out of which 49.6% had children under the age of 18 living with them, 75.5% were married couples living together, 3.4% had a female householder with no husband present, and 18.0% were non-families. 14.4% of all households were made up of individuals, and 3.3% had someone living alone who was 65 years of age or older. The average household size was 2.99 and the average family size was 3.33.

In the township the population was spread out, with 33.8% under the age of 18, 5.0% from 18 to 24, 29.8% from 25 to 44, 26.1% from 45 to 64, and 5.3% who were 65 years of age or older. The median age was 37 years. For every 100 females, there were 103.8 males. For every 100 females age 18 and over, there were 102.1 males.

The median income for a household in the township was $84,619, and the median income for a family was $93,913. Males had a median income of $61,127 versus $34,438 for females. The per capita income for the township was $31,099. About 0.7% of families and 2.1% of the population were below the poverty line, including 0.2% of those under age 18 and 18.3% of those age 65 or over.
