= Elgin, Minnesota =

City in Minnesota, United States

Elgin
- City
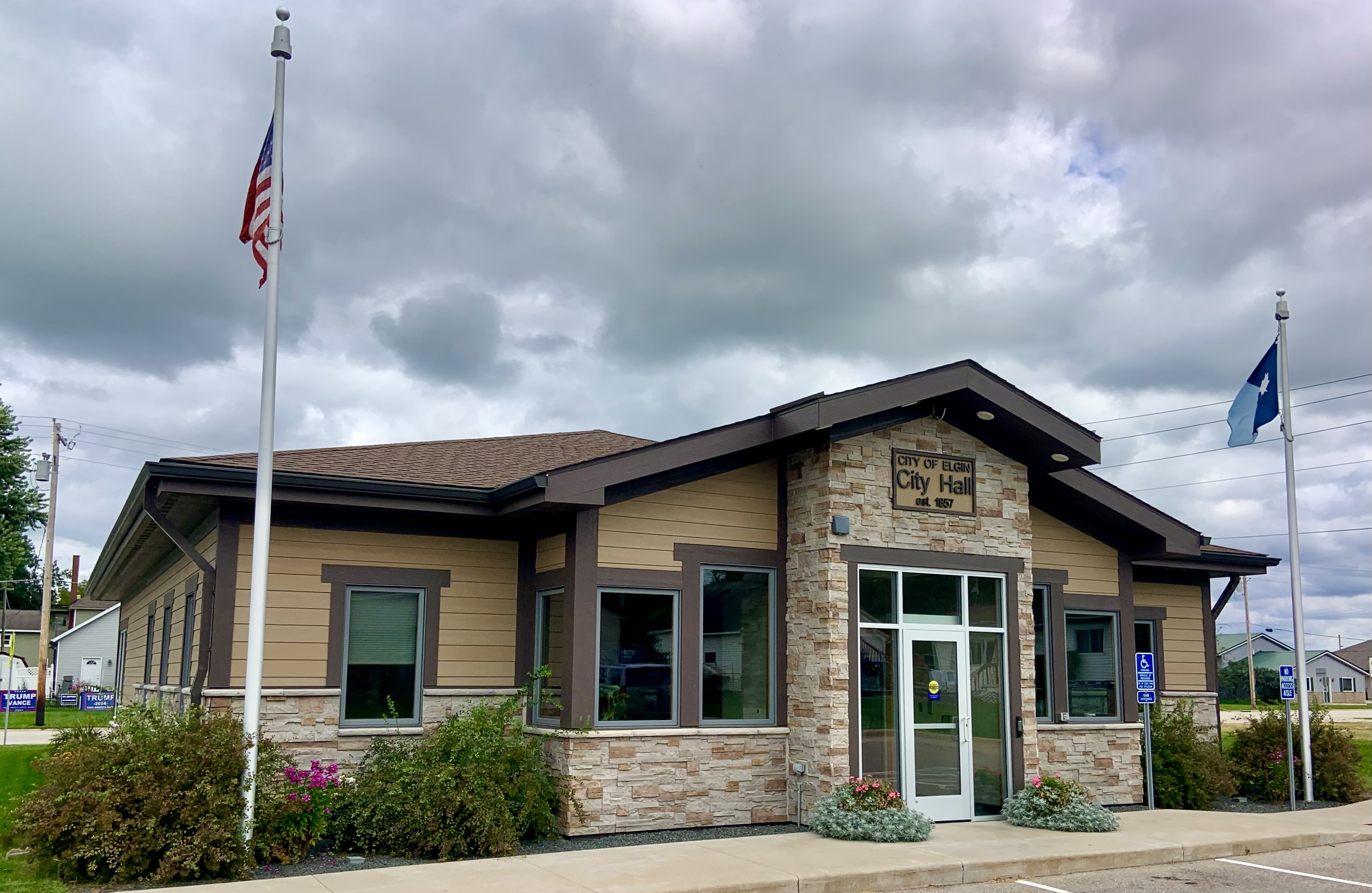
- City Hall
- Motto: "A Quiet Community-With The Right Kind Of Noise"
- Location of Elgin, Minnesota
- Coordinates: 44°7′51″N 92°15′15″W
- Country: United States
- State: Minnesota
- County: Wabasha

Area
  - Total: 0.92 sq mi (2.38 km^{2})
  - Land: 0.92 sq mi (2.38 km^{2})
  - Water: 0 sq mi (0.00 km^{2})
- Elevation: 1,060 ft (323 m)

Population (2020)
  - Total: 1,115
  - Density: 1,213.8/sq mi (468.67/km^{2})
- Time zone: UTC-6 (Central (CST))
  - Summer (DST): UTC-5 (CDT)
- ZIP code: 55932
- Area code: 507
- FIPS code: 27-18530
- GNIS feature ID: 0643242
- Website: www.elginmn.com

Elgin is a city in Wabasha County, Minnesota, United States on Minnesota State Highway 42. As of the 2020 census, Elgin had a population of 1,115. Its annual festival is Elgin Cheese Days.

== History ==
Elgin was laid out in 1878 when the railroad was extended to that point. The city was named after Elgin, in Scotland.

== Geography ==
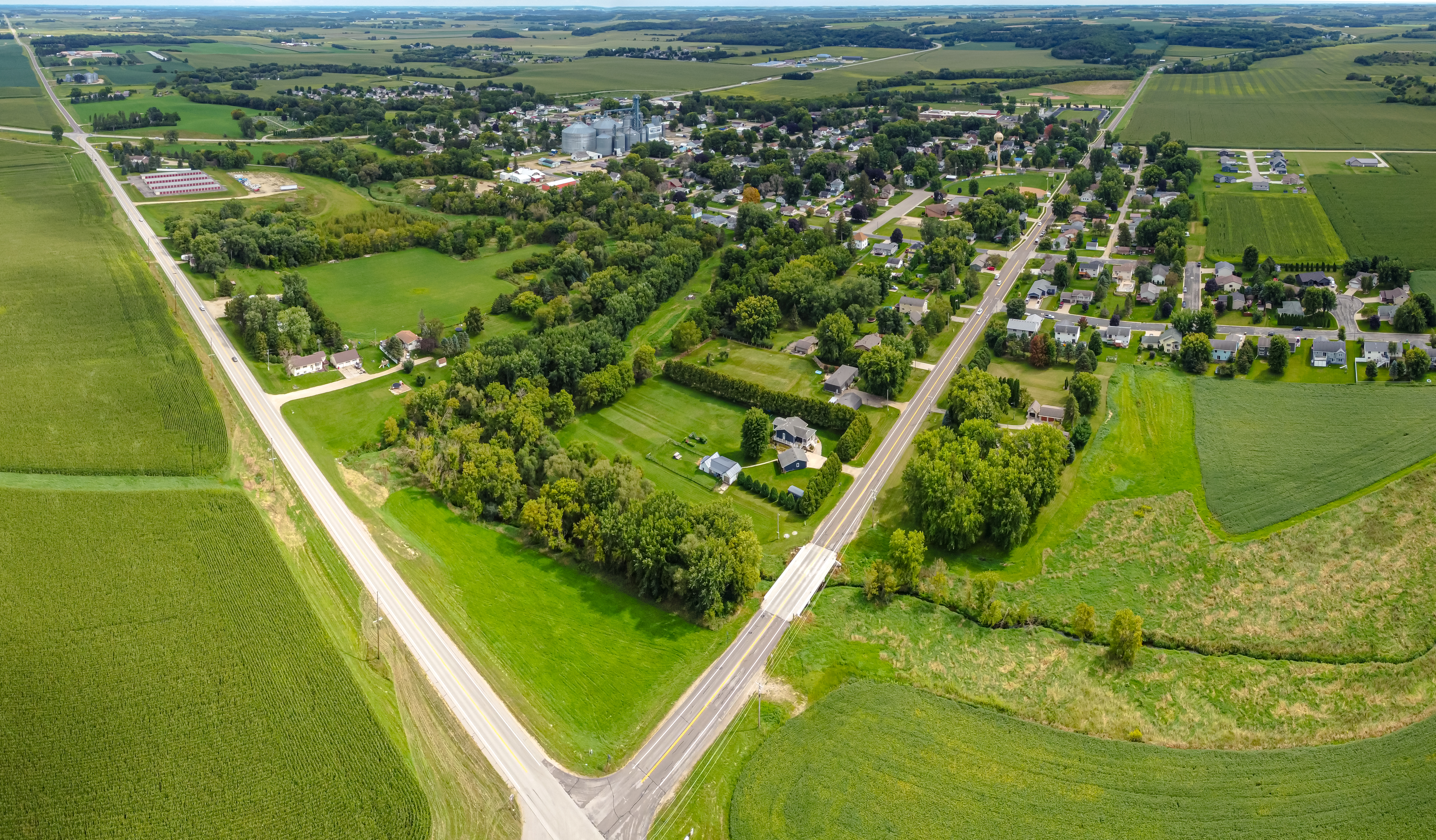

According to the United States Census Bureau, the city has a total area of 0.92 square miles (2.38 km^{2}), all of it land.

Minnesota State Highway 42 and County Highway 2 are two of the main routes in the community.

== Demographics ==
Historical population
Census	Pop.	Note	%±
1880	144		—
1900	344		—
1910	324		−5.8%
1920	501		54.6%
1930	466		−7.0%
1940	468		0.4%
1950	438		−6.4%
1960	521		18.9%
1970	580		11.3%
1980	667		15.0%
1990	733		9.9%
2000	826		12.7%
2010	1,089		31.8%
2020	1,115		2.4%
U.S. Decennial Census

It has several farms. As of late 2012, the oldest living person in Minnesota lives in Elgin, at age 112.

=== 2010 census ===
As of the census of 2010, there were 1,089 people, 400 households, and 295 families living in the city. The population density was 1,183.7 inhabitants per square mile (457.0/km^{2}). There were 418 housing units at an average density of 454.3 per square mile (175.4/km^{2}). The racial makeup of the city was 97.9% White, 0.5% African American, 0.1% Native American, 0.5% Asian, 0.2% from other races, and 0.9% from two or more races. Hispanic or Latino of any race were 2.0% of the population.

There were 400 households, of which 46.5% had children under the age of 18 living with them, 56.3% were married couples living together, 9.5% had a female householder with no husband present, 8.0% had a male householder with no wife present, and 26.3% were non-families. 21.0% of all households were made up of individuals, and 7.3% had someone living alone who was 65 years of age or older. The average household size was 2.72 and the average family size was 3.15.

The median age in the city was 31 years. 31.6% of residents were under the age of 18; 8% were between the ages of 18 and 24; 32.9% were from 25 to 44; 19.2% were from 45 to 64; and 8.4% were 65 years of age or older. The gender makeup of the city was 50.4% male and 49.6% female.

=== 2000 census ===
As of the census of 2000, there were 826 people, 321 households, and 215 families living in the city. The population density was 1,262.8 inhabitants per square mile (487.6/km^{2}). There were 324 housing units at an average density of 495.3 per square mile (191.2/km^{2}). The racial makeup of the city was 98.91% White, 0.12% African American, 0.12% Native American, 0.12% Asian, 0.61% from other races, and 0.12% from two or more races. Hispanic or Latino of any race were 0.97% of the population.

There were 321 households, out of which 40.5% had children under the age of 18 living with them, 50.5% were married couples living together, 12.1% had a female householder with no husband present, and 33.0% were non-families. 27.1% of all households were made up of individuals, and 11.5% had someone living alone who was 65 years of age or older. The average household size was 2.57 and the average family size was 3.17.

In the city, the population was spread out, with 31.8% under the age of 18, 9.8% from 18 to 24, 32.9% from 25 to 44, 14.5% from 45 to 64, and 10.9% who were 65 years of age or older. The median age was 31 years. For every 100 females, there were 100.0 males. For every 100 females age 18 and over, there were 94.1 males.

The median income for a household in the city was $41,184, and the median income for a family was $47,917. Males had a median income of $33,000 versus $22,679 for females. The per capita income for the city was $18,745. About 3.4% of families and 5.5% of the population were below the poverty line, including 6.6% of those under age 18 and 12.4% of those age 65 or over.

== Climate ==
The Köppen Climate Classification subtype for this climate is "Dfb" (Warm Summer Continental Climate).

== Notable people ==
- H. H. Atherton, Minnesota state senator; early settler of Elgin
