= Haverhill Township, Olmsted County, Minnesota =

Haverhill Township, Minnesota
- Township
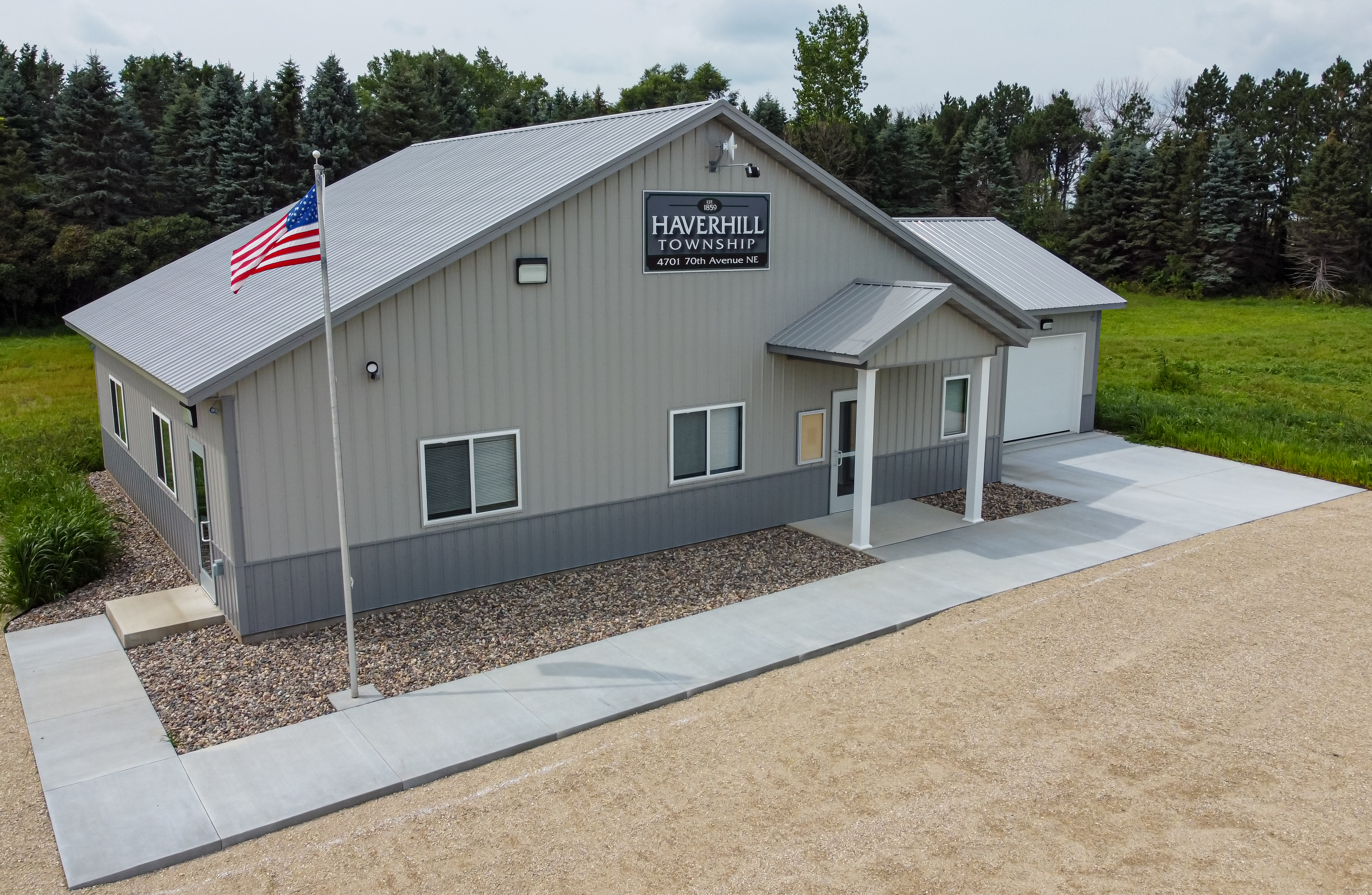
- Town hall

- Location within the state of Minnesota Haverhill Township, Minnesota (the United States)
- Coordinates: 44°3′49″N 92°24′5″W
- Country: United States
- State: Minnesota
- County: Olmsted

Area
  - Total: 33.3 sq mi (86.2 km^{2})
  - Land: 33.3 sq mi (86.2 km^{2})
  - Water: 0 sq mi (0.0 km^{2})
- Elevation: 1,257 ft (383 m)

Population (2000)
  - Total: 1,601
  - Density: 48/sq mi (18.6/km^{2})
- Time zone: UTC-6 (Central (CST))
  - Summer (DST): UTC-5 (CDT)
- FIPS code: 27-27692
- GNIS feature ID: 0664417
- Website: https://haverhilltwp.org/

Haverhill Township is a township in Olmsted County, Minnesota, United States. The population was 1,601 at the 2000 census.

== History ==
Haverhill Township was organized in 1858, and named after Haverhill, Massachusetts.

== Geography ==
According to the United States Census Bureau, the township has a total area of 33.3 square miles (86 km^{2}), all land.

== Demographics ==
As of the census of 2000, there were 1,601 people, 531 households, and 452 families residing in the township. The population density was 48.1 inhabitants per square mile (18.6/km^{2}). There were 543 housing units at an average density of 16.3 per square mile (6.3/km^{2}). The racial makeup of the township was 95.63% White, 1.12% African American, 0.19% Native American, 1.81% Asian, 0.19% from other races, and 1.06% from two or more races. Hispanic or Latino of any race were 0.50% of the population.

There were 531 households, out of which 41.6% had children under the age of 18 living with them, 79.8% were married couples living together, 3.8% had a female householder with no husband present, and 14.7% were non-families. 12.2% of all households were made up of individuals, and 3.6% had someone living alone who was 65 years of age or older. The average household size was 2.94 and the average family size was 3.21.

In the township the population was spread out, with 29.5% under the age of 18, 6.6% from 18 to 24, 25.3% from 25 to 44, 29.1% from 45 to 64, and 9.5% who were 65 years of age or older. The median age was 40 years. For every 100 females, there were 106.3 males. For every 100 females age 18 and over, there were 108.9 males.

The median income for a household in the township was $75,343, and the median income for a family was $87,004. Males had a median income of $50,500 versus $31,833 for females. The per capita income for the township was $34,804. About 1.0% of families and 2.8% of the population were below the poverty line, including 0.9% of those under age 18 and 4.7% of those age 65 or over.
