= Salem Township, Olmsted County, Minnesota =

Salem Township, Minnesota
- Township
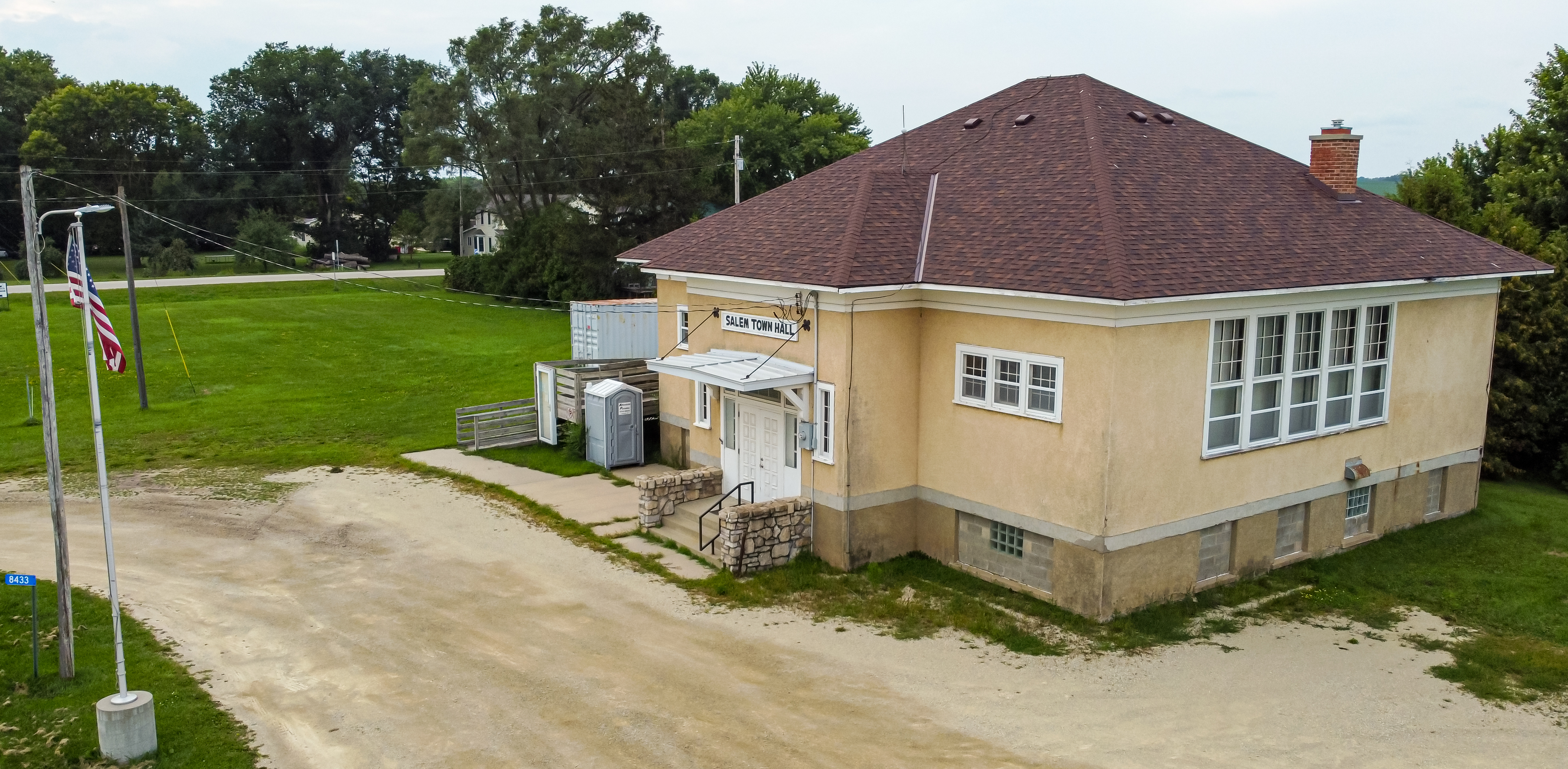
- Town hall

- Location within the state of Minnesota Salem Township, Minnesota (the United States)
- Coordinates: 43°58′39″N 92°36′47″W
- Country: United States
- State: Minnesota
- County: Olmsted

Area
  - Total: 35.7 sq mi (92.5 km^{2})
  - Land: 35.7 sq mi (92.5 km^{2})
  - Water: 0 sq mi (0.0 km^{2})
- Elevation: 1,070 ft (326 m)

Population (2000)
  - Total: 1,061
  - Density: 30/sq mi (11.5/km^{2})
- Time zone: UTC-6 (Central (CST))
  - Summer (DST): UTC-5 (CDT)
- FIPS code: 27-58234
- GNIS feature ID: 0665538
- Website: http://www.salemmn.com/

Salem Township is a township in Olmsted County, Minnesota. The population was 1,061 at the 2000 census. The township hall is located at the junction of County Road 25 (Salem Road) and County Road 3 at the unincorporated community of Salem Corners.

Salem Township was organized in 1858, and named after Salem, Illinois.

== Geography ==
According to the United States Census Bureau, the township has a total area of 35.7 square miles (92.5 km^{2}), all land.

== Demographics ==
As of the census of 2000, there were 1,061 people, 399 households, and 308 families residing in the township. The population density was 29.7 inhabitants per square mile (11.5/km^{2}). There were 409 housing units at an average density of 11.4/sq mi (4.4/km^{2}). The racial makeup of the township was 98.87% White, 0.28% Asian, 0.19% from other races, and 0.66% from two or more races. Hispanic or Latino of any race were 0.19% of the population.

There were 399 households, out of which 31.8% had children under the age of 18 living with them, 68.7% were married couples living together, 4.3% had a female householder with no husband present, and 22.6% were non-families. 16.3% of all households were made up of individuals, and 5.0% had someone living alone who was 65 years of age or older. The average household size was 2.66 and the average family size was 2.99.

In the township the population was spread out, with 25.8% under the age of 18, 7.9% from 18 to 24, 26.2% from 25 to 44, 29.5% from 45 to 64, and 10.6% who were 65 years of age or older. The median age was 40 years. For every 100 females, there were 103.6 males. For every 100 females age 18 and over, there were 102.3 males.

The median income for a household in the township was $54,107, and the median income for a family was $61,875. Males had a median income of $37,917 versus $29,135 for females. The per capita income for the township was $28,340. About 2.3% of families and 2.7% of the population were below the poverty line, including 2.0% of those under age 18 and 4.5% of those age 65 or over.
