= Eyota Township, Olmsted County, Minnesota =

Eyota Township, Minnesota
- Township
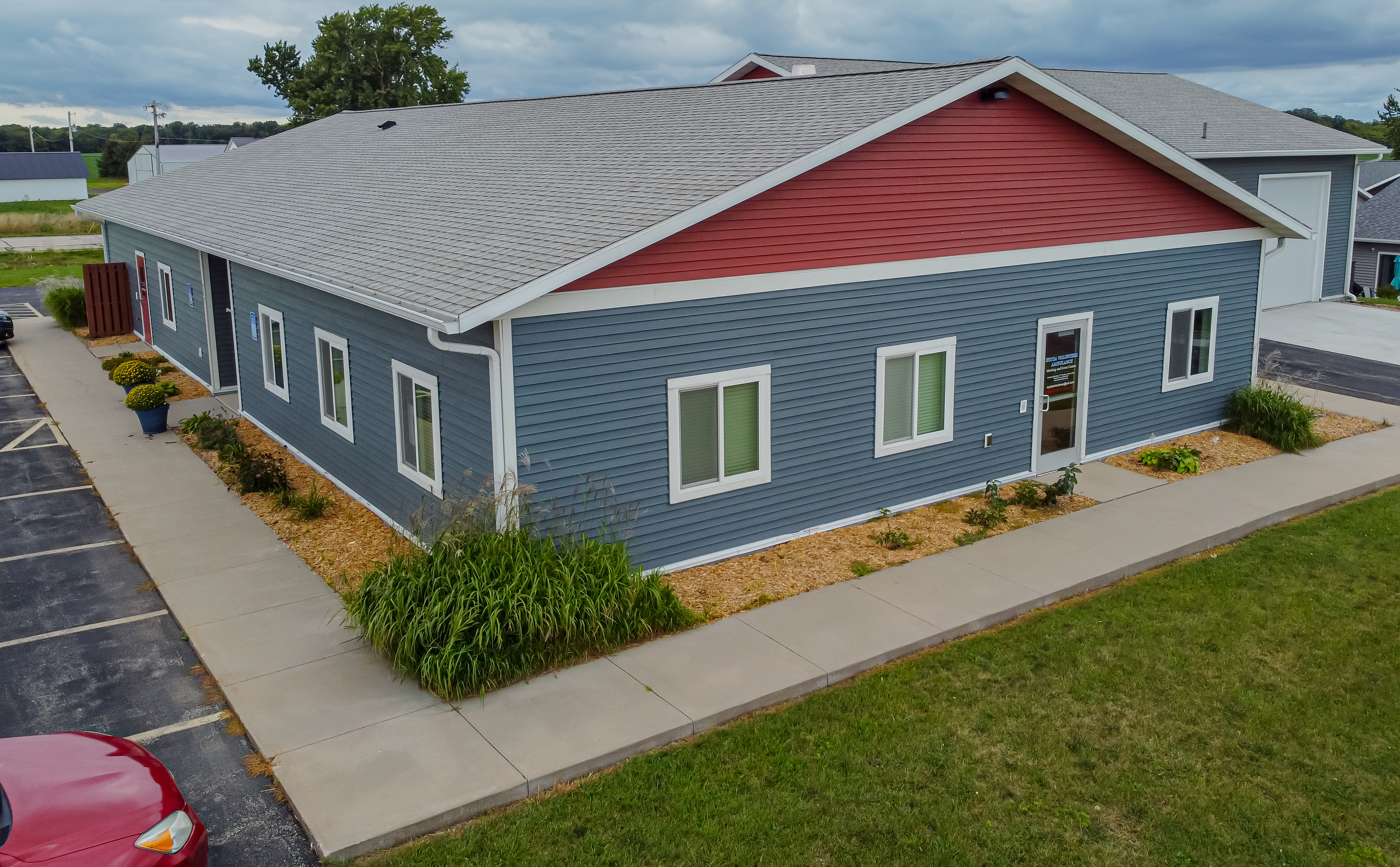
- Town hall and ambulance service center

- Location within the state of Minnesota Eyota Township, Minnesota (the United States)
- Coordinates: 43°58′31″N 92°15′54″W
- Country: United States
- State: Minnesota
- County: Olmsted

Area
  - Total: 34.2 sq mi (88.5 km^{2})
  - Land: 34.2 sq mi (88.5 km^{2})
  - Water: 0 sq mi (0.0 km^{2})
- Elevation: 1,270 ft (387 m)

Population (2000)
  - Total: 448
  - Density: 13/sq mi (5.1/km^{2})
- Time zone: UTC-6 (Central (CST))
  - Summer (DST): UTC-5 (CDT)
- ZIP code: 55934
- Area code: 507
- FIPS code: 27-20132
- GNIS feature ID: 0664125
- Website: https://www.eyotatownship.com/

Eyota Township is a township in Olmsted County, Minnesota, United States. The population was 448 at the 2000 census.

== History ==
Eyota Township was organized in 1858. Eyota is derived from the Sioux Indian word iyotak, meaning "greatest" or "most".

== Geography ==
According to the United States Census Bureau, the township has a total area of 34.2 square miles (89 km^{2}), all land.

== Demographics ==
As of the census of 2000, there were 448 people, 165 households, and 132 families residing in the township. The population density was 13.1 inhabitants per square mile (5.1/km^{2}). There were 171 housing units at an average density of 5.0 per square mile (1.9/km^{2}). The racial makeup of the township was 96.65% White, 0.45% Asian, 1.56% from other races, and 1.34% from two or more races. Hispanic or Latino of any race were 1.79% of the population.

There were 165 households, out of which 36.4% had children under the age of 18 living with them, 70.3% were married couples living together, 5.5% had a female householder with no husband present, and 20.0% were non-families. 17.0% of all households were made up of individuals, and 6.7% had someone living alone who was 65 years of age or older. The average household size was 2.72 and the average family size was 2.99.

In the township the population was spread out, with 26.8% under the age of 18, 7.6% from 18 to 24, 26.6% from 25 to 44, 27.2% from 45 to 64, and 11.8% who were 65 years of age or older. The median age was 39 years. For every 100 females, there were 101.8 males. For every 100 females age 18 and over, there were 100.0 males.

The median income for a household in the township was $48,750, and the median income for a family was $52,188. Males had a median income of $30,278 versus $28,500 for females. The per capita income for the township was $22,016. None of the families and 0.8% of the population were living below the poverty line, including no under eighteens and none of those over 64.
