= New Haven Township, Olmsted County, Minnesota =

New Haven Township, Minnesota
- Township
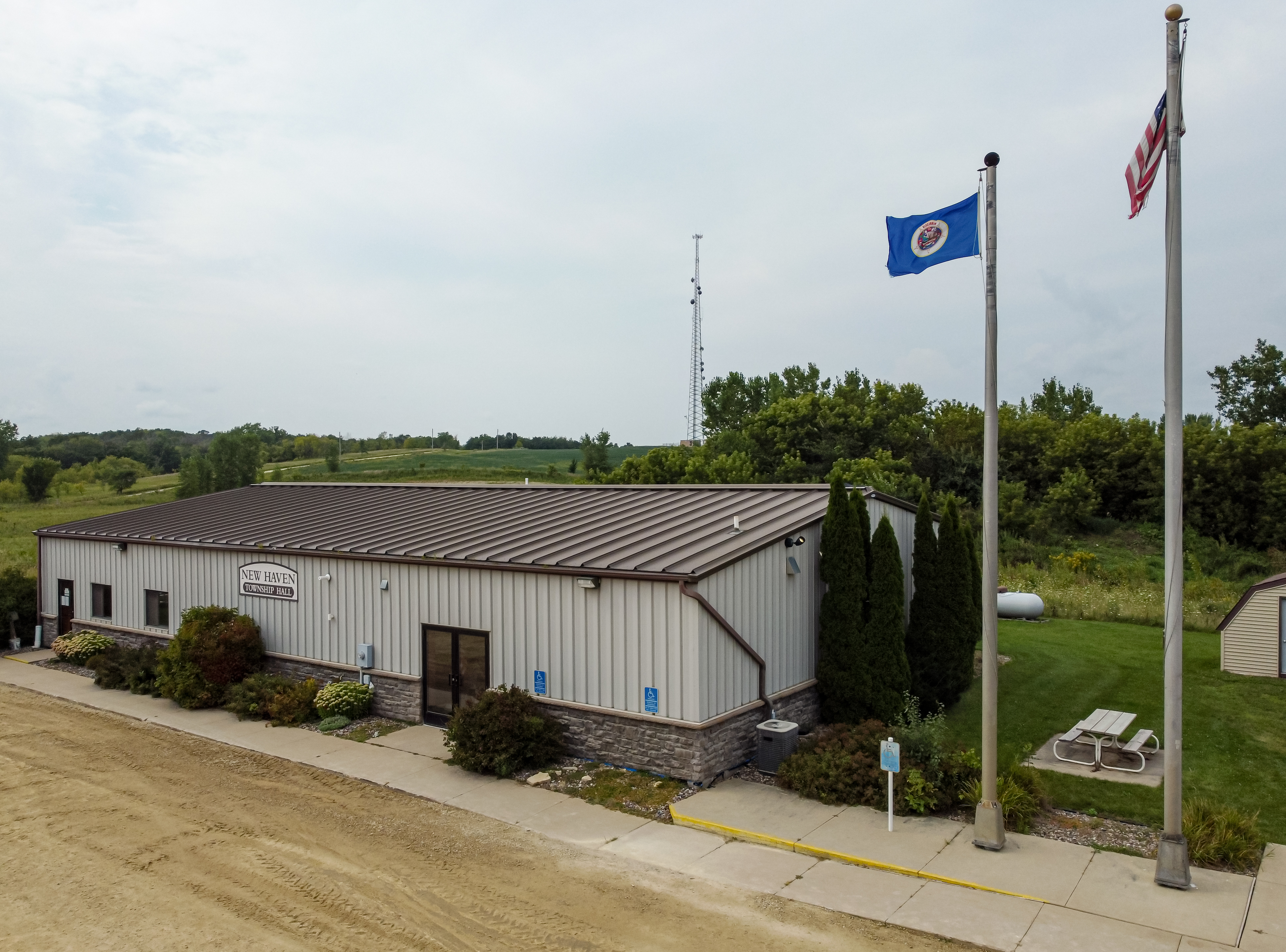
- Town hall

- Location within the state of Minnesota New Haven Township, Minnesota (the United States)
- Coordinates: 44°8′18″N 92°37′3″W
- Country: United States
- State: Minnesota
- County: Olmsted

Area
  - Total: 35.8 sq mi (92.7 km^{2})
  - Land: 35.8 sq mi (92.6 km^{2})
  - Water: 0.039 sq mi (0.1 km^{2})
- Elevation: 1,070 ft (326 m)

Population (2000)
  - Total: 1,205
  - Density: 34/sq mi (13/km^{2})
- Time zone: UTC-6 (Central (CST))
  - Summer (DST): UTC-5 (CDT)
- FIPS code: 27-45610
- GNIS feature ID: 0665097
- Website: https://newhaventownship.org/

New Haven Township is a township in Olmsted County, Minnesota, United States. The population was 1,205 at the 2000 census.

New Haven Township was organized in 1858, and named after New Haven, Connecticut.

== Geography ==
According to the United States Census Bureau, the township has a total area of 35.8 square miles (92.7 km^{2}), of which 35.8 square miles (92.6 km^{2}) is land and 0.04 square mile (0.1 km^{2}) (0.06%) is water.

== Demographics ==
As of the census of 2000, there were 1,205 people, 427 households, and 357 families residing in the township. The population density was 33.7 inhabitants per square mile (13.0/km^{2}). There were 433 housing units at an average density of 12.1 per square mile (4.7/km^{2}). The racial makeup of the township was 98.26% White, 0.75% Native American, 0.08% Asian, 0.08% from other races, and 0.83% from two or more races. Hispanic or Latino of any race were 0.50% of the population.

There were 427 households, out of which 35.1% had children under the age of 18 living with them, 77.5% were married couples living together, 3.3% had a female householder with no husband present, and 16.2% were non-families. 14.1% of all households were made up of individuals, and 4.9% had someone living alone who was 65 years of age or older. The average household size was 2.82 and the average family size was 3.11.

In the township the population was spread out, with 25.6% under the age of 18, 6.6% from 18 to 24, 26.2% from 25 to 44, 28.2% from 45 to 64, and 13.4% who were 65 years of age or older. The median age was 41 years. For every 100 females, there were 109.6 males. For every 100 females age 18 and over, there were 110.1 males.

The median income for a household in the township was $58,583, and the median income for a family was $62,386. Males had a median income of $37,159 versus $30,200 for females. The per capita income for the township was $23,518. About 1.1% of families and 2.3% of the population were below the poverty line, including 3.3% of those under age 18 and 5.2% of those age 65 or over.
