= Kalmar Township, Olmsted County, Minnesota =

Kalmar Township, Minnesota
- Township
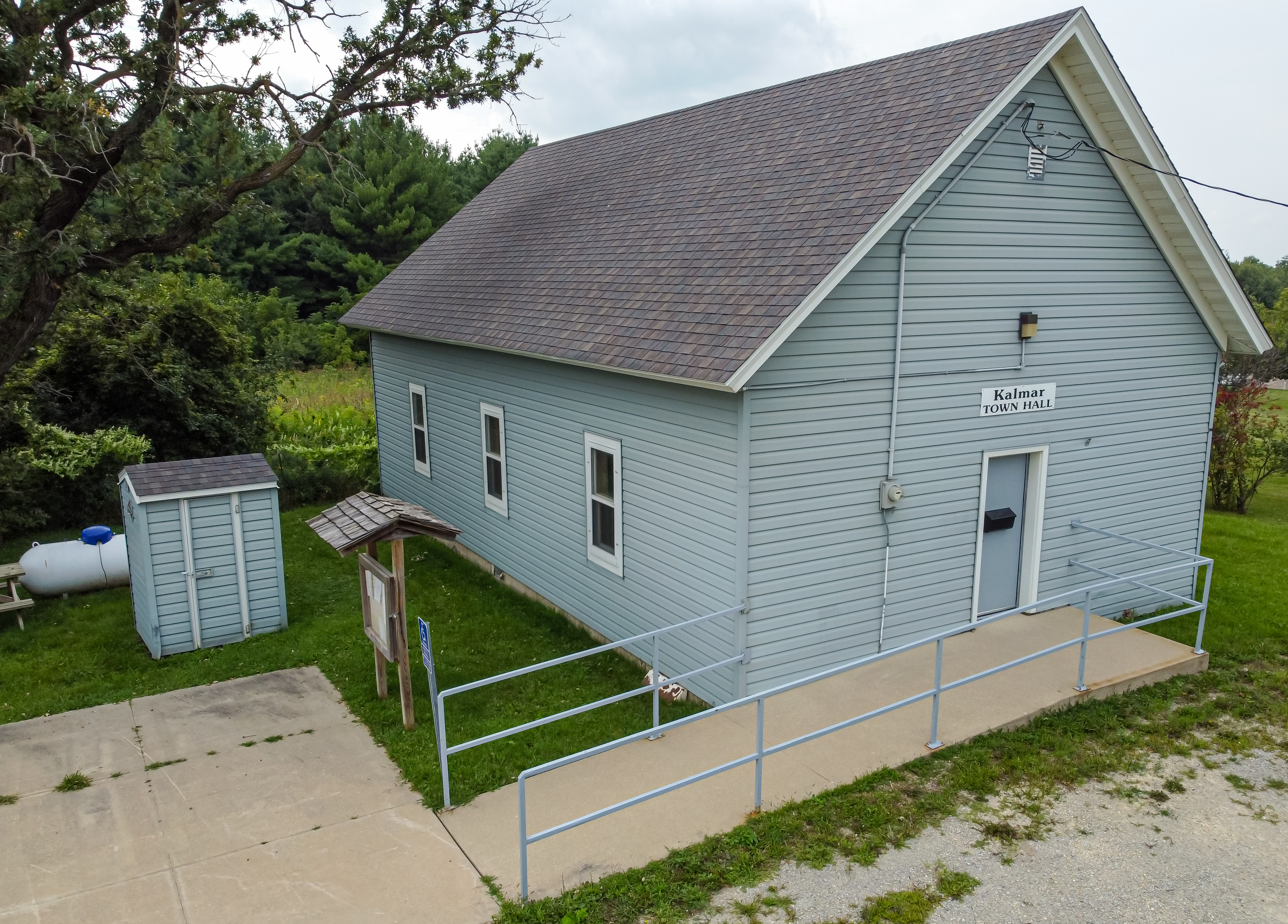
- Town hall

- Location within the state of Minnesota Kalmar Township, Minnesota (the United States)
- Coordinates: 44°3′41″N 92°37′24″W
- Country: United States
- State: Minnesota
- County: Olmsted

Area
  - Total: 34.1 sq mi (88.3 km^{2})
  - Land: 34.1 sq mi (88.3 km^{2})
  - Water: 0 sq mi (0.0 km^{2})
- Elevation: 1,198 ft (365 m)

Population (2000)
  - Total: 1,196
  - Density: 35/sq mi (13.5/km^{2})
- Time zone: UTC-6 (Central (CST))
  - Summer (DST): UTC-5 (CDT)
- FIPS code: 27-32282
- GNIS feature ID: 0664593
- Website: https://kalmartownshipmn.gov/

Kalmar Township is a township in Olmsted County, Minnesota, United States. The population was 1,196 at the 2000 census. It surrounds the city of Byron.

Kalmar Township was organized in 1858, and named after Kalmar, in Sweden.

== Geography ==
According to the United States Census Bureau, the township has a total area of 34.1 square miles (88 km^{2}), all land.

== Demographics ==
As of the census of 2000, there were 1,196 people, 418 households, and 349 families residing in the township. The population density was 35.1 inhabitants per square mile (13.6/km^{2}). There were 431 housing units at an average density of 12.6 per square mile (4.9/km^{2}). The racial makeup of the township was 98.49% White, 0.84% African American, 0.08% Native American, 0.17% Asian, 0.25% from other races, and 0.17% from two or more races. Hispanic or Latino of any race were 0.33% of the population.

There were 418 households, out of which 37.3% had children under the age of 18 living with them, 76.8% were married couples living together, 3.1% had a female householder with no husband present, and 16.5% were non-families. 12.9% of all households were made up of individuals, and 3.6% had someone living alone who was 65 years of age or older. The average household size was 2.85 and the average family size was 3.13.

In the township the population was spread out, with 26.5% under the age of 18, 8.4% from 18 to 24, 27.8% from 25 to 44, 29.5% from 45 to 64, and 7.9% who were 65 years of age or older. The median age was 39 years. For every 100 females, there were 107.3 males. For every 100 females age 18 and over, there were 107.8 males.

The median income for a household in the township was $64,792, and the median income for a family was $67,125. Males had a median income of $41,477 versus $28,984 for females. The per capita income for the township was $24,860. About 3.9% of families and 4.5% of the population were below the poverty line, including 6.1% of those under age 18 and 7.3% of those age 65 or over.
