= Farmington Township, Olmsted County, Minnesota =

Farmington Township, Minnesota
- Township
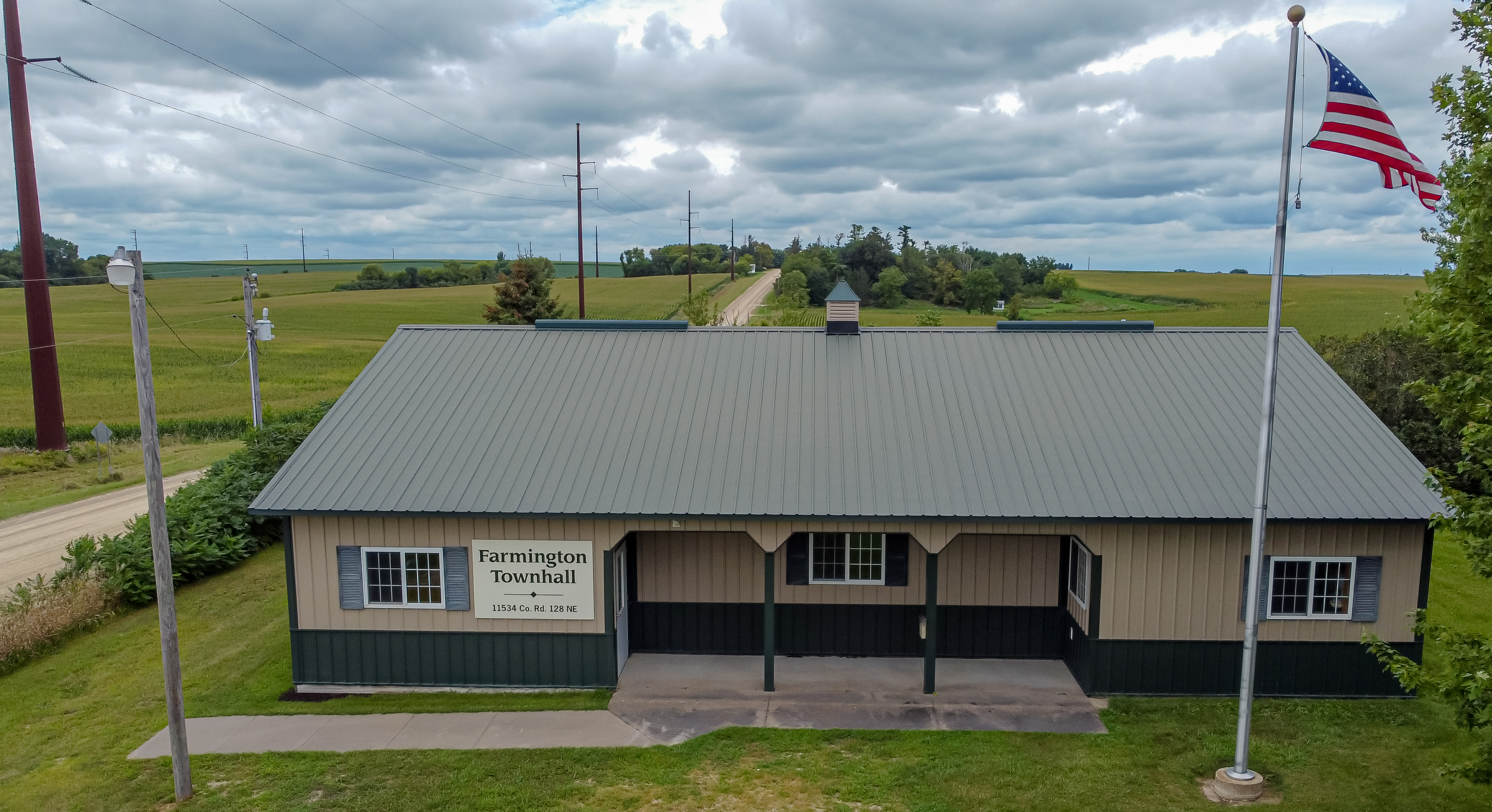
- Town hall

- Location within the state of Minnesota Farmington Township, Minnesota (the United States)
- Coordinates: 44°9′19″N 92°22′11″W
- Country: United States
- State: Minnesota
- County: Olmsted

Area
  - Total: 35.8 sq mi (92.7 km^{2})
  - Land: 35.8 sq mi (92.7 km^{2})
  - Water: 0 sq mi (0.0 km^{2})
- Elevation: 1,079 ft (329 m)

Population (2000)
  - Total: 516
  - Density: 15/sq mi (5.6/km^{2})
- Time zone: UTC-6 (Central (CST))
  - Summer (DST): UTC-5 (CDT)
- FIPS code: 27-20636
- GNIS feature ID: 0664147

Farmington Township is a township in Olmsted County, Minnesota, United States. The population was 516 at the 2000 census.

Farmington Township was organized in 1858, and named for their fertile farmland.

== Geography ==
According to the United States Census Bureau, the township has a total area of 35.8 square miles (93 km^{2}), all land.

== Demographics ==
As of the census of 2000, there were 516 people, 189 households, and 143 families residing in the township. The population density was 14.4 inhabitants per square mile (5.6/km^{2}). There were 197 housing units at an average density of 5.5 per square mile (2.1/km^{2}). The racial makeup of the township was 97.48% White, and 2.52% from two or more races. Hispanic or Latino of any race were 0.39% of the population.

There were 189 households, out of which 34.9% had children under the age of 18 living with them, 68.8% were married couples living together, 2.6% had a female householder with no husband present, and 24.3% were non-families. 21.2% of all households were made up of individuals, and 11.1% had someone living alone who was 65 years of age or older. The average household size was 2.73 and the average family size was 3.19.

In the township the population was spread out, with 27.1% under the age of 18, 6.8% from 18 to 24, 25.2% from 25 to 44, 26.7% from 45 to 64, and 14.1% who were 65 years of age or older. The median age was 40 years. For every 100 females, there were 109.8 males. For every 100 females age 18 and over, there were 118.6 males.

The median income for a household in the township was $52,750, and the median income for a family was $56,607. Males had a median income of $33,958 versus $31,389 for females. The per capita income for the township was $22,618. About 4.0% of families and 5.0% of the population were below the poverty line, including 8.0% of those under age 18 and none of those age 65 or over.
