= Byron (disambiguation) =

Byron usually refers to the English poet and writer George Gordon Byron, 6th Baron Byron (1788–1824), commonly known as Lord Byron.

Byron may also refer to:

== People and fictional characters ==
- Byron (name), including lists of people and fictional characters with the surname or given name

== Places ==
=== United States ===
- Byron, California, a census-designated place
- Byron, Georgia, a city
- Byron, Illinois, a city
  - Byron Nuclear Generating Station
- Byron, LaPorte County, Indiana
- Byron, Parke County, Indiana
- Byron, Maine, a town
- Byron, Michigan, a village
- Byron, Minnesota, a city
- Byron, Missouri, an unincorporated community
- Byron, Nebraska, a village
- Byron, Nevada, a ghost town
- Byron, New York, a town
- Byron, Ohio, an unincorporated community
- Byron, Oklahoma, a town
- Byron Township (disambiguation)
- Lake Byron (South Dakota)
- Byron, Fond du Lac County, Wisconsin, a town
  - Byron (community), Fond du Lac County, Wisconsin, an unincorporated community within the town
  - Byron Hill (railroad location), a hill between the town and the city of Fond du Lac
- Byron, Monroe County, Wisconsin, a town
- Byron, Wyoming, a town

=== Australia ===
- Byron Bay, a coastal town in north-east New South Wales
- Byron Shire, a local government area in New South Wales
- Cape Byron, easternmost point on mainland Australia
- Electoral district of Byron, from 1913 to 1927

=== Outer space ===
- Byron (crater), on Mercury
- 3306 Byron, a main-belt asteroid

=== Elsewhere ===
- Byron Sound, Falkland Islands
- Byron, Ontario, Canada, a neighbourhood of the city of London
- Byron Point, on the north shore of Drury Inlet on the Central Coast of British Columbia, Canada

== Ships ==
- Byron, a schooner built about 1849 and sunk in Lake Michigan in 1867, see Byron shipwreck
- SS Byron, an ocean liner built in 1914 as Vasilefs Constantinos, renamed Byron in 1924 and scrapped in 1937
- HMS Byron, a frigate built in 1943 and scrapped in 1947

== Arts and entertainment ==
- Byron (play), a 1908 play by British writer Alicia Ramsey about Lord Byron
- Byron (TV film), a 2003 BBC production based on Lord Byron's life
- Byron (band), a Romanian alternative/progressive rock band

== Other uses ==
- Baron Byron, a title in the Peerage of England
- Byron High School (disambiguation)
- Byron Company, a New York City photography studio founded in 1892
- Byron Gallery, a New York City art gallery from 1961 to 1971
- Byron Hamburgers, a chain of hamburger restaurants in the United Kingdom

== See also ==
- Port Byron (disambiguation)
- Biram (disambiguation)
- Biron (disambiguation)
