= Biron (surname) =

Biron is a toponymic surname that is derived from either one of several places in France, or, as a variant spelling of Byron, from Byram, North Yorkshire. Notable people with the surname include:

- Armand de Gontaut, Baron of Biron (1524–1592), celebrated French soldier
- Charles de Gontaut, 1st Duke of Biron (1562–1602), French marshal, son of Armand de Biron
- Ernst Johann von Biron (1690–1772), Russian regent (1740), sovereign Duke of Courland (1737–40, 1763–69)
- Gustav von Biron (1700–1746), brother of Ernst Johann, first active service commander of the Izmaylovsky Regiment (1734–1740)
- Peter von Biron (1724–1800), sovereign Duke of Courland (1769–95), son of Ernst Johann von Biron
- Armand Louis de Gontaut (1747–1793), known as Biron, soldier and politician
- Henry Biron (1835–1915), English clergyman and cricketer
- Martin Biron (born 1977), NHL goalie
- Mathieu Biron (born 1980), ice hockey defenceman, brother of Martin Biron
- Rodrigue Biron (1934–2025), Canadian politician
- Geneviève Biron, Canadian civil servant in Quebec

== See also ==
- Biram (disambiguation), a variant spelling
- Byram (surname), a variant spelling
- Byrom, a variant spelling
- Byrum (surname), a variant spelling
