= Byron, Wisconsin =

Byron is the name of places in the U.S. state of Wisconsin:

- Byron, Fond du Lac County, Wisconsin, a town
- Byron (community), Fond du Lac County, Wisconsin, an unincorporated community
- Byron, Monroe County, Wisconsin, a town
- South Byron, Wisconsin, an unincorporated community

== Railroad features ==
- Byron Hill (railroad location)
