= Byrom =

Toponymic surname

Byrom is a toponymic surname, a variant spelling of Byron, derived from Byram, North Yorkshire. Notable people with the surname include:

- Eddie Byrom (born 1997), Zimbabwean cricketer
- Edward Byrom (1724–1773), English accountant
- Joel Byrom (born 1986), English footballer
- John Byrom (disambiguation)
- Larry Byrom (born 1948), American guitarist
- Monty Byrom (born 1958), American rock, blues and country singer-songwriter
- Ray Byrom (1935–2020), English footballer

== See also ==
- George Byrom Whittaker (1793–1847), English bookseller and publisher
- Gordon Byrom Rogers (1901–1967), United States Army lieutenant general
- Biram (disambiguation), a variant spelling
- Biron (surname), a variant spelling
- Byram (surname), a variant spelling
- Byrum (surname), a variant spelling
