= Byron (name) =

Byron ( /ˈbaɪrən/) is an English toponymic surname that is derived from Byram, North Yorkshire. Its use as a given name derives from the surname.

== Surname ==
- Byron (surname)

== Given name ==
- Byron Adams, American composer
- Byron Allen (born 1961), American comic and television personality
- Byron G. Allen (1901–1988), American politician
- Byron Alvarez (born 1978), Mexican football player
- Byron Andrews (1852–1910), American journalist
- Byron Anthony (born 1984), Welsh football (soccer) player
- Byron Baer (1929–2007), American politician
- Byron Bailey (1930–1998), American football player
- Byron Barr (1917–1966), American actor
- Byron Barrera (died 1990), Guatemalan journalist
- Byron Barton (1930–2023), American author
- Byron Barwig (1862–1943), American politician
- Byron W. Bender (1929–2020), American professor
- Byron Daniel Bernstein (1989–2020), Israeli-American streamer and esports player, known as Reckful
- Byron Black (born 1969), Zimbabwean tennis player
- Byron B. Brainard (1894–1940), American electrician
- Byron Brown (born 1958), Mayor of Buffalo, New York
- Byron Buxton (born 1993), MLB outfielder
- Byron Cage (born 1962), American gospel singer
- Byron Chamberlain (born 1971), American NFL tight end
- Byron Cherry (born 1955), American actor, businessman, entrepreneur
- Byron Lavoy Cockrell (1935–2007), American rocket scientist
- Byron Cook (born 1954), American politician
- Byron Cowart (born 1996), American football player
- Byron M. Cutcheon (1836–1908), American politician
- Byron Dafoe (born 1971), ice hockey goaltender
- Byron W. Dickson (1875–1930), American football player
- Byron Dorgan (born 1942), U.S. Senator
- Byron H. Dunbar (1927–2007), American attorney
- Byron Eby (1904–1990), American football player
- Byron Fidetzis, Greek cellist and conductor
- Byron Foulger (1898–1970), American actor
- Byron B. Harlan (1886–1949), American attorney
- Byron G. Harlan (1861–1936), American singer
- Byron Haskin (1899–1984), U.S. film director
- Byron Hemingway (born 1954), American football player
- Byron G. Highland (1934–1967), American photographer
- Byron O. House (1902–1969), American jurist
- Byron Howard (born 1968), U.S. film director, producer, screenwriter, story artist and animator
- Byron E. Hyatt (1873–1936), American mayor
- Byron Ingram (born 1964), American football player
- Byron "Peewee" Jarrett (born 1999), American football player
- Byron F. Johnson (1894–1980), American officer
- Byron L. Johnson (1917–2000), American economist
- Byron Jones (born 1992), American NFL safety
- Byron M. Jones, Christian film producer
- Byron Q. Jones (1888–1959), American aviator
- Byron Katie (born 1942), American self-help author and founder of "The Work"
- Byron Keith (1917–1996), American actor
- Byron Kelleher (born 1976), New Zealand rugby player
- Byron Krieger (1920–2015), American fencer
- Byron Barnard Lamont (born 1945), Australian botanist and professor
- Byron Larkin (born 1965), American basketball player
- Byron Lee (1935–2008), Jamaican musician and record producer
- Byron Lee (born 1964), American NFL linebacker
- Byron Leftwich (born 1980), American NFL quarterback
- Byron K. Lichtenberg (born 1948), American astronaut
- Byron Mann, American actor
- Byron J. Matthews (1928–2023), American politician
- Byron Maxwell (born 1988), American NFL cornerback
- Byron E. Morgan (1889–1963), American football coach
- Byron Murphy (born 1998), American football player
- Byron Murphy II (born 2002), American football player
- Byron Nelson (1912–2006), PGA Tour golfer
- Byron R. Newton (1861–1938), American journalist
- Byron Ortile (born 2002), Filipino actor
- Byron C. Ostby (1924–2003), American politician
- Byron S. Payne (1876–1949), American attorney
- Byron Root Pierce (1829–1924), American dentist
- Byron W. Preston (1858–1939), American justice
- Byron Pringle (born 1993), American football player
- Byron B. Randolph, Democratic president
- Byron Ritchie (born 1977), Canadian ice hockey player
- Byron F. Ritchie (1853–1928), American lawyer and politician
- Byron Roberts, Black metal artist, nicknamed 'Lord Byron'
- Byron G. Rogers (1900–1983), U.S. representative
- Byron Scott (born 1961), American NBA coach and former player
- Byron N. Scott (1903–1991), American lawyer
- Byron Sharp, Australian professor of marketing
- Byron D. Shear (1869–1929), American politician
- Byron Sher (1928–2026), American politician
- Byron Smith, convicted American killer
- Byron G. Stout (1829–1896), American politician
- Byron A. Stover (1890–1984), American politician
- Byron Stroud (born 1969), bassist for metal bands Fear Factory, Zimmers Hole and City of Fire
- Byron Tenorio (born 1966), Ecuadorian football (soccer) player
- Byron Thames (born 1969), American actor and musician
- Byron M. Tunnell (1925–2000), American attorney
- Byron Velvick (born 1964), professional bass fisherman and bachelor for Season 6 of the United States television show The Bachelor
- Byron F. Wackett (1912–1980), American politician
- Byron White (1917–2002), American football player, later Associate Justice of the Supreme Court of the United States
- Byron Wien (1933–2023), American investor and author
- Byron August Wilson (1918–1992), American artist
- Byron York (born 1955), American conservative
- Byron Young (disambiguation), multiple people

== Fictional characters ==
- Byron Basset, the sleeping puppy from Tiny Toon Adventures
- Byron (Babylon 5), a character from the television series Babylon 5
- Byron "Buster" Bluth, a character from the comedic television series Arrested Development
- Byron Hadley, the sadistic prison captain from The Shawshank Redemption
- Byron Montgomery, a character from the television series and teen novels Pretty Little Liars
- Byron the Bulb, a long-burning light-bulb from Thomas Pynchon's novel Gravity's Rainbow
- Byron Orlok, a washed-up horror actor in the 1968 movie "Targets"
- Byron Orpheus, character in adult swim series The Venture Brothers
- Byron Sully, main character in series Dr. Quinn, Medicine Woman
- Byron Ellington, talked about character in series White Collar
- Byron Henry, character in novels by Herman Wouk "The Winds of War," and "The War and Remembrance."
- Byron, a character of the 2018 mobile game Brawl Stars
- Byron Love, a popular character from the multi-media franchise Inazuma Eleven

== See also ==
- Bayron Piedra, Ecuadorian athlete
- Biram (disambiguation), a variant spelling
- Biron (surname), a variant spelling
- Biron (disambiguation)
- Bryon, a given name
- Byram (surname), a variant spelling
- Byrom, a variant spelling
- Byrum (surname), a variant spelling
