= Bryon =

Bryon is an English-derived given name. Notable people with the given name include:

- Bryon Allen (born 1992), American basketball player for Hapoel Eilat of the Israeli Basketball Premier League
- Bizzy Bone (born 1976 as Bryon McCane), American rapper
- Bryon Baltimore (born 1952), Canadian former NHL and WHA player
- Bryon Butler (1934–2001), English writer and broadcaster
- Bryon Nickoloff (1956–2004), Canadian international chess master
- Bryon Russell (born 1970), American basketball player
- Bryon Wilfert (born 1952), Canadian politician

== See also ==
- Brian, a given name
- Bryonia (common name bryony), a genus of flowering plants
- Bryony (given name)
- Bryonycta, a genus of moths
- Byron (disambiguation)
- Byron (name), given name and surname
