= Byram (surname) =

English toponymic surname

Byram is an English toponymic surname, a variant spelling of Byron, derived from Byram, North Yorkshire. Notable people with the surname include:

- Abram Robertson Byram (c. 1825 – 1893), English-Australian mayor
- Amanda Byram (born 1973), Irish television host
- Amick Byram (born 1955), American Gospel Singer and tenor
- Bowen Byram (born 2001), Canadian ice hockey player
- Gavin Byram (born 1974), English cricketer
- Sam Byram (born 1993), English footballer
- Shawn Byram (born 1968), Canadian ice hockey player

== See also ==
- Biram (disambiguation), a variant spelling
- Biron (surname), a variant spelling
- Byrom, a variant spelling
- Byrum (surname), a variant spelling
