= Byrum (surname) =

Byrum is a toponymic surname, a variant spelling of Byron, derived from Byram, North Yorkshire. Notable people with the surname include:

- Carl Byrum, American football player
- Curt Byrum, professional golfer
- Dianne Byrum, politician
- Dion Byrum, cornerback
- John Byrum, director
- Porter Byrum, attorney
- Tom Byrum, professional golfer

== See also ==
- Biram (disambiguation), a variant spelling
- Biron (surname), a variant spelling
- Byram (surname), a variant spelling
- Byrom, a variant spelling
