= Matawan, Minnesota =

Unincorporated community in Minnesota, US

Matawan
- Unincorporated community
- Location within Minnesota Location within the United States
- Coordinates: 43°51′29″N 93°38′10″W
- Country: United States
- State: Minnesota
- County: Waseca
- Township: Byron Township
- Elevation: 1,148 ft (350 m)
- Time zone: UTC-6 (Central (CST))
  - Summer (DST): UTC-5 (CDT)
- ZIP code: 56072
- Area code: 507
- GNIS feature ID: 647610

Matawan is an unincorporated community in Byron Township, Waseca County, Minnesota, United States, near New Richland. The community is located near the junction of Waseca County Roads 11 and 28. The Big Cobb River and the Little Cobb River both flow nearby.

A post office called Matawan was established in 1907, and remained in operation until 1972. According to Warren Upham, the community may be named after Matawan, New Jersey.
