= Byron Township, Minnesota =

Byron Township is the name of two towns in the U.S. state of Minnesota:

- Byron Township, Cass County, Minnesota
- Byron Township, Waseca County, Minnesota

== See also ==
- Byron Township (disambiguation)
