= Richfield Bus Company =

Bus operator in Minnesota, United States

Rochester City Lines
- Parent: Richfield Bus Company
- Headquarters: 1825 North Broadway
- Locale: Rochester, Minnesota
- Service area: Southeastern Minnesota
- Service type: bus service
- Routes: 12 commuter
- Website: http://www.rochestercitylines.com/index.php

Richfield Bus Company is a bus operator in Minnesota, United States. It was founded in the Minneapolis suburb of Richfield in 1959 by George and Marilyn Holter, who began running a school bus route in Richfield. Through Heartland Tours and Travel, they operate tour buses to many destinations around North America. Richfield Bus runs a commuter coach to the southeastern city of Rochester where their affiliated company Rochester City Lines, which began in 1966, operates a network of commuter buses, and until 2012 operated a network of public transit buses. RCL and Richfield Bus also run local charter bus services in southeastern Minnesota and nearby Iowa and Wisconsin.

Drivers of RCL's city buses within Rochester unionized in 2007 under the Amalgamated Transit Union, though that action did not include drivers for the commuter lines or charter buses.

The Holter family still runs the company today, and they celebrated a 50th anniversary in 2009. The owners have an affinity for vintage buses, and have a handful of them in their own collection that have been fully restored. At least one of the company's old buses is also operated by the Minnesota Transportation Museum. Stan Holter runs the MTM's classic bus division while also working as general manager for Richfield Bus.

== City routes ==
RCL formerly ran a number of routes in the City of Rochester, Minnesota. In 2010, however, the Federal Transit Administration directed that the contract between the city and provider of transit services be competitively bid to comply with federal transit aid requirements. The city received bids from four companies, including Rochester City Lines and First Transit, with First Transit judged to have offered the best value. As a result, on July 2, 2012, Rochester City Lines ceased operation of fixed-routes within Rochester, with First Transit taking over operation of those routes, becoming Rochester Public Transit.

== Commuter routes ==
Commuter bus routes fan out in several directions from Rochester, reaching three dozen cities including Owatonna, Austin, Winona, and Lake City. The Richfield Bus Company runs a route from the Metro Blue Line's 28th Avenue station in Bloomington through Inver Grove Heights to Rochester.

Commuter bus fares use a lettered zone structure, ranging from the lowest cost "C" zone for a nearby city like Byron up to "G" for Twin Cities stops. Routes include:

- I-90 Commuter
- Twin Cities Commuter
- MN 16 Commuter
- MN 30 Commuter
- MN 56 Commuter
- US 14 East Commuter
- US 14 West Commuter
- US 52 East Commuter
- US 52 West Commuter
- US 61 North Commuter
- US 63 North Commuter
- US 63 South Commuter
