= Link (Rochester) =

Planned bus rapid transit line in Rochester, Minnesota

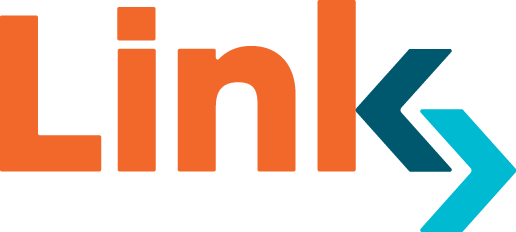

Overview
- Operator: Rochester Public Transit
- Status: Under construction
- Began service: Late 2026

Route
- Route type: Bus rapid transit
- Locale: Rochester, Minnesota
- Communities served: ?
- Start: West Transit Village
- Via: 2nd Street SW (phase 1); Broadway Avenue (phase 2)
- End: Downtown Rochester (phase 1); East Transit Village (phase 2)
- Length: 2.6 mi (4.2 km) (Phase 1) (Additional 1 mi (1.6 km) planned in phase 2)
- Stations: 8 (planned) (4 more planned in phase 2)

Service
- Level: Daily
- Frequency: Every 5 minutes peak Every 10 to 20 minutes non-peak
- Journey time: 13 minutes
- Operates: 5:00 am–11:00 pm

Link, formerly known as Rochester Rapid Transit and the Downtown Circulator, is a bus rapid transit (BRT) line under construction for downtown Rochester, Minnesota. The 2.6 mile route would connect downtown Rochester, Mayo Clinic's downtown campus, Mayo Clinic's Saint Mary's campus, University of Minnesota Rochester, and a new 13-acre transit-oriented development at the western terminus.

As of March 2025, construction has begun for the Link BRT project and the anticipated project completion is the end of 2026.

== History ==
On May 4, 2020, the Rochester City Council unanimously approved a multi-phased approach to construction. The full system would be built in two phases: Phase 1 would be 2.6 miles (4.2 kilometres) built on Second Street from West Transit Village to Civic District station; Phase 2 would extend the line approximately 1 mile (1.6 kilometres) south on Broadway Avenue to East Transit Village. The phased approach of the project would raise the cost-effectiveness rating with the Federal Transit Administration from "medium-high" to "high", making the project more competitive for funding through the Small Starts program. The phased approach also gives the city and Olmsted County additional time to plan the redevelopment of the former Seneca Foods site into East Transit Village. On Wednesday October 21, 2020, project leaders announced that engineering, traffic, and environmental analyses would begin.

Phase 1 of the project is expected to cost $114 million, with local funding coming from the State of Minnesota, Olmsted County Transit Aid, state provided Destination Medical Center funds, and the City of Rochester. On August 28, 2020, the City of Rochester submitted a Small Starts grant application to the Federal Transit Administration to fund 49% of Phase 1's cost. Phase 2 will be developed with Olmsted County for future grant submittal.

The complete line is expected to cost $203 million. Estimated daily ridership on Phase 1 of the project is 9,925 daily riders, with the complete line seeing an estimated 11,850 daily riders.

On September 13, 2021, Rochester officials unveiled the Link brand accompanied with a mockup station. The mockup, situated at the future Civic Center Station site on 2nd Street at 3rd Avenue SE, demonstrates bus rapid transit features such as the shelter layout, off-board fare collection, real-time signage, and an 80 ft (24 m) long level platform. The site also features renderings of the line's seven stations and more information about the project.

In early February 2022, Rochester City Council announced they would review potential changes to the line after receiving public feedback. The proposed changes would upgrade amenities at the two primary stations, Saint Mary's Transit Center and 2nd Avenue Station, and extend the line south along 3rd Avenue SE with an additional station near 6th Street. The changes under review would an additional year for environmental review and would bring the cost of Phase 1 to $146.8 million. The additional $32.8 million would be covered by the Federal Transit Administration, increasing their share of the project costs from 49% to 60%.

== Route ==
The 2.6 mile route begins at Mayo Clinic's west lot at 2nd Street and 23rd Avenue SW. On August 25, 2020, the DMC Corporation Board of Directors voted unanimously to modify the DMC's boundaries to include the westernmost portion of the route, making the project eligible to receive DMC funding. The route continues east along 2nd Street in dedicated bus lanes, stopping at five enhanced stations along 2nd Street. After Broadway Avenue, the route would make a clockwise loop with two additional stops at 2nd Street & 3rd Avenue SE and 4th Street & Broadway Avenue before returning down 2nd Street the opposite direction.

Link will use new 60 ft articulated battery electric buses with three-doors and will be operated by Rochester Public Transit.
