= Byram cum Sutton =

Civil parish in North Yorkshire, England

Coordinates: 53.723°N 1.257°W

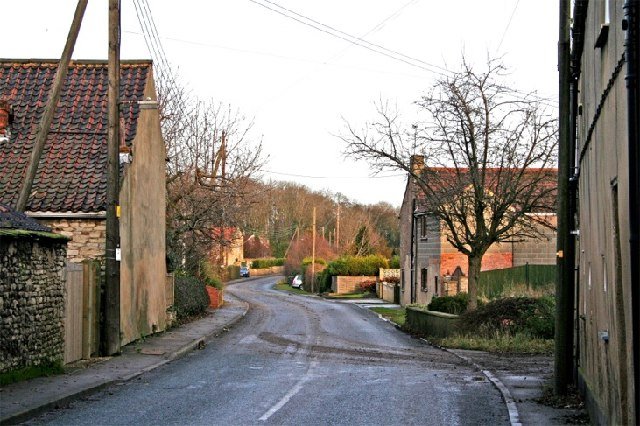

- Location within North Yorkshire
- Population: 1,434 (2011 Census)
- OS grid reference: SE490254
- Civil parish: Byram cum Sutton
- Unitary authority: North Yorkshire
- Ceremonial county: North Yorkshire
- Region: Yorkshire and the Humber
- Country: England
- Sovereign state: United Kingdom
- Post town: KNOTTINGLEY
- Postcode district: WF11
- Dialling code: 01977
- Police: North Yorkshire
- Fire: North Yorkshire
- Ambulance: Yorkshire
- UK Parliament: Selby

Byram cum Sutton is a civil parish in the county of North Yorkshire, England, containing the village of Byram and the hamlet of Sutton. The River Aire runs to the south of the parish, and the town of Knottingley is the other side of the river in West Yorkshire. The A1(M) passes to the west of the parish. According to the 2001 census, it had a population of 1,406, increasing to 1,434 at the 2011 Census.

== History ==
The civil parish was created in 1891, when the civil parishes of Byram cum Poole and Sutton, both in the West Riding of Yorkshire, were terminated. The new parish became part of Pontefract Rural District when it was formed in 1894, and of Osgoldcross Rural District from 1938. From 1974 to 2023 it was part of the Selby District, it is now administered by the unitary North Yorkshire Council.

== See also ==
- Listed buildings in Byram cum Sutton
