= Sutton, Selby =

Village in North Yorkshire, England

Coordinates: 53.722°N 1.252°W

Sutton
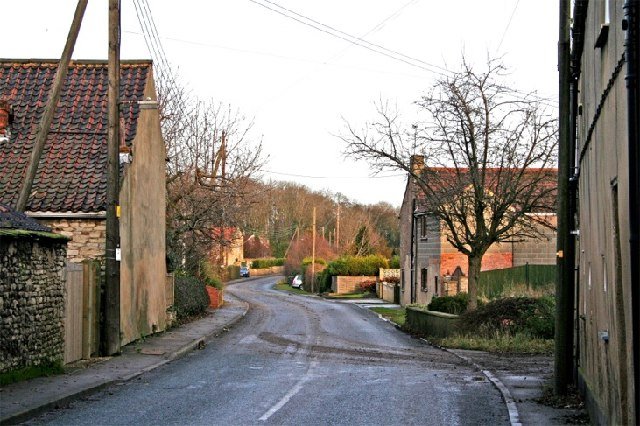

- Location within North Yorkshire
- OS grid reference: SE495253
- Civil parish: Byram cum Sutton
- Unitary authority: North Yorkshire
- Ceremonial county: North Yorkshire
- Region: Yorkshire and the Humber
- Country: England
- Sovereign state: United Kingdom
- Post town: KNOTTINGLEY
- Postcode district: WF11
- Dialling code: 01977
- Police: North Yorkshire
- Fire: North Yorkshire
- Ambulance: Yorkshire
- UK Parliament: Selby

Sutton is a small village in the civil parish of Byram cum Sutton, in North Yorkshire, England. It lies 1 mile north of Knottingley, across the River Aire in West Yorkshire.

The toponym is from the Old English sūð tūn, meaning "south farmstead". The place was once known as Sutton in Elmet, from its location in the district of Elmet. Sutton was historically a township in the ancient parish of Brotherton in the West Riding of Yorkshire. It became a separate civil parish in 1866, but on 26 March 1891 the civil parish was abolished and merged with the civil parish of Byram cum Poole to form the civil parish of Byram cum Sutton. In 1881 the parish had a population of 39. In 1974 it was transferred to the new county of North Yorkshire. From 1974 to 2023 it was part of the Selby District, it is now administered by the unitary North Yorkshire Council.

== See also ==
- Listed buildings in Byram cum Sutton
