= Byron, Minnesota =

City in Minnesota, United States

- City
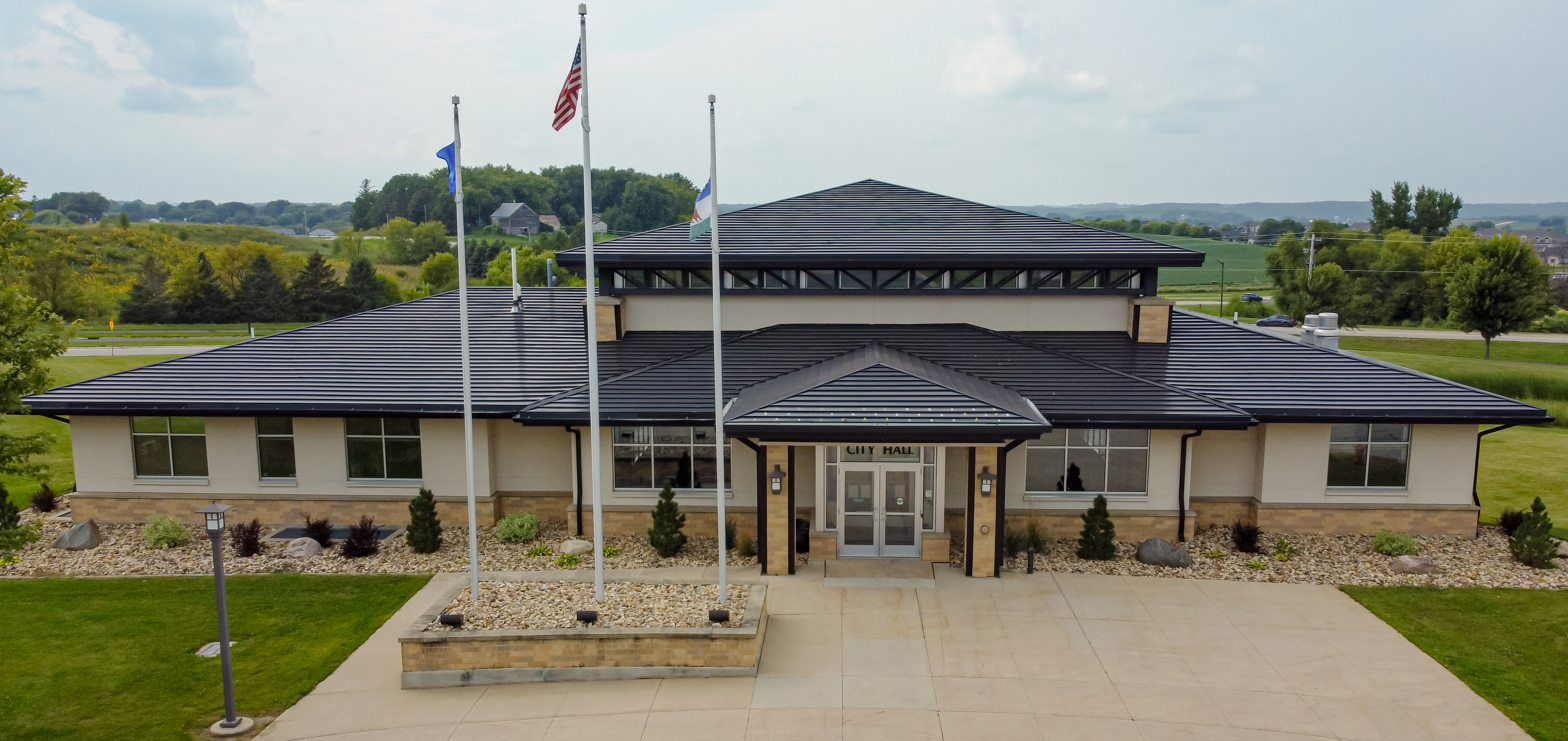
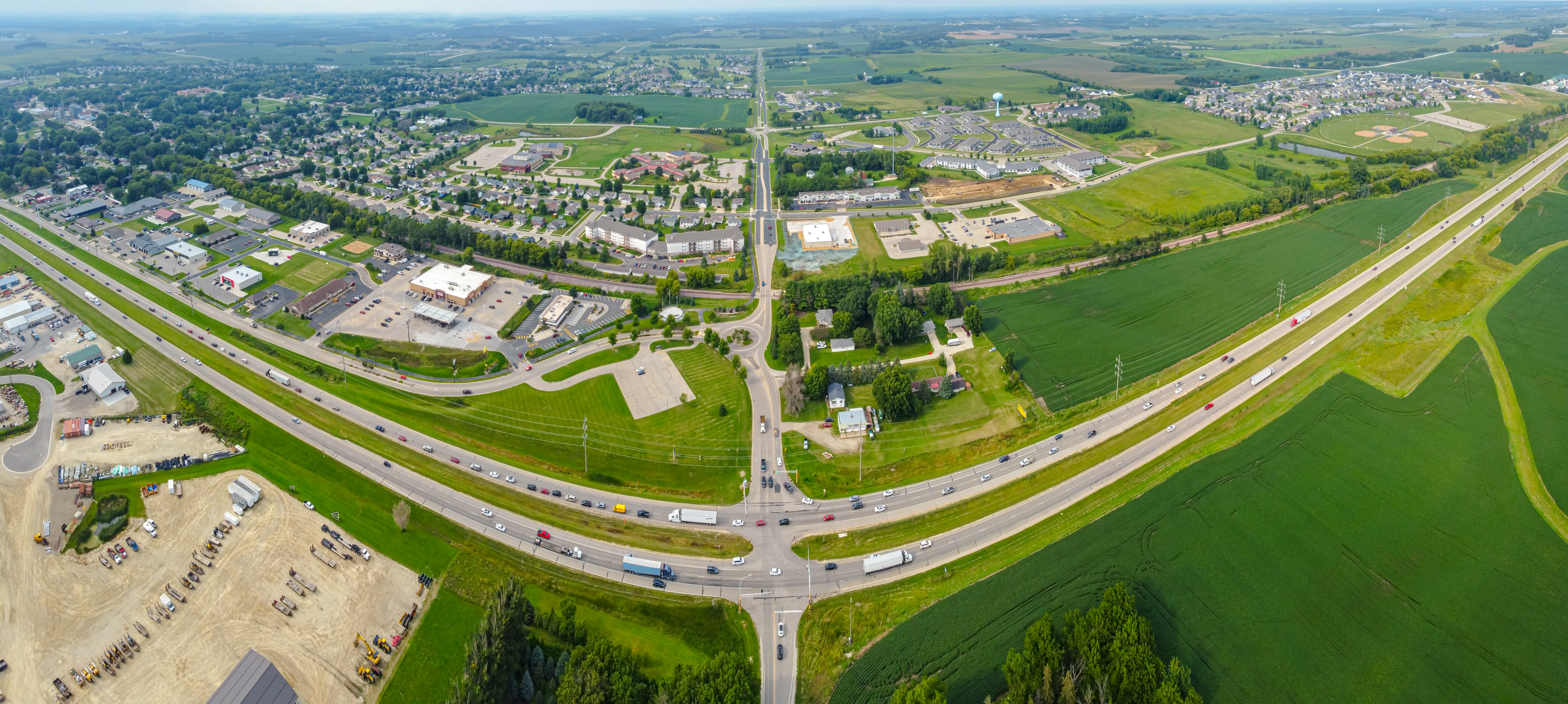
- Byron City Hall Aerial view of Byron
- Motto: "Where Neighbors Become Family"
- Interactive location map of Byron
- Coordinates: 44.038344°N 92.640823°W
- Country: United States
- State: Minnesota
- County: Olmsted
- Township: Kalmar Township
- Platted: 1864
- Incorporated: February 12, 1873
- Named for: Charles Van Dusen

Government
  - Type: Mayor–Council
  - Mayor: Andrew Ihrke
  - Councilmembers: Steven Cook; Justin Blom; Dan Even; Dan Mesenburg

Area
  - City: 3.168 sq mi (8.205 km^{2})
  - Land: 3.168 sq mi (8.205 km^{2})
  - Water: 0 sq mi (0.000 km^{2}) 0.0%
- Elevation: 1,188 ft (362 m)

Population (2020)
  - City: 6,312
  - Estimate (2024): 6,809
  - Density: 1,992/sq mi (769.3/km^{2})
  - Urban: 6,341
  - Metro: 230,742
- Time zone: UTC–6 (Central (CST))
  - Summer (DST): UTC–5 (CDT)
- ZIP Code: 55920
- Area codes: 507 and 924
- FIPS code: 27-09154
- GNIS feature ID: 2393488
- Website: byronmn.com

There are also two Byron Townships in Minnesota.

Byron is a city in Olmsted County, Minnesota, United States. About 10 miles west of the city of Rochester and 6 miles east of the city of Kasson on U.S. Route 14. It is surrounded by Kalmar Township. The population was 6,312 at the 2020 census, and was estimated at 6,809 in 2024. Byron is part of the Rochester metropolitan area.

Local industries are in the form of farm services and printing. A grain elevator is situated next to the rail line that runs through town, which is owned by the Dakota, Minnesota and Eastern Railroad. Schmidt Printing (a subsidiary of Taylor Corporation) is another major company in town. Byron is also a bedroom community for nearby Rochester, Minnesota.

== History ==
Byron was platted in 1864. A post office called Byron has been in operation since 1868. by George W. Van Dusen which he named after his birthplace of Byron, New York. Byron was incorporated on February 12, 1873. Before the town was established, a small community known as Bear Grove was west of present-day Byron.

== Geography ==
According to the United States Census Bureau, the city has a total area of 3.168 square miles (8.21 km^{2}), all land. It has an elevation of 362 m (1,188 ft).

=== Climate ===
Climate data for Byron 4N, Minnesota (1991–2020 normals, extremes 1993–2018)
Month	Jan	Feb	Mar	Apr	May	Jun	Jul	Aug	Sep	Oct	Nov	Dec	Year
Record high °F (°C)	55 (13)	61 (16)	80 (27)	89 (32)	96 (36)	97 (36)	103 (39)	97 (36)	92 (33)	93 (34)	77 (25)	65 (18)	103 (39)
Mean daily maximum °F (°C)	22.6 (−5.2)	27.4 (−2.6)	40.2 (4.6)	55.0 (12.8)	67.6 (19.8)	77.9 (25.5)	81.2 (27.3)	79.1 (26.2)	72.0 (22.2)	58.2 (14.6)	41.9 (5.5)	28.3 (−2.1)	54.3 (12.4)
Daily mean °F (°C)	13.0 (−10.6)	16.8 (−8.4)	30.0 (−1.1)	43.3 (6.3)	55.7 (13.2)	66.2 (19.0)	69.7 (20.9)	67.2 (19.6)	59.4 (15.2)	45.9 (7.7)	32.3 (0.2)	19.7 (−6.8)	43.3 (6.3)
Mean daily minimum °F (°C)	3.5 (−15.8)	6.1 (−14.4)	19.7 (−6.8)	31.5 (−0.3)	43.8 (6.6)	54.5 (12.5)	58.1 (14.5)	55.3 (12.9)	46.8 (8.2)	33.5 (0.8)	22.8 (−5.1)	11.1 (−11.6)	32.2 (0.1)
Record low °F (°C)	−36 (−38)	−40 (−40)	−26 (−32)	7 (−14)	20 (−7)	32 (0)	40 (4)	33 (1)	24 (−4)	12 (−11)	−11 (−24)	−26 (−32)	−40 (−40)
Average precipitation inches (mm)	1.02 (26)	1.12 (28)	2.09 (53)	3.62 (92)	4.31 (109)	5.27 (134)	4.63 (118)	4.80 (122)	3.47 (88)	2.44 (62)	1.90 (48)	1.32 (34)	35.99 (914)
Average snowfall inches (cm)	8.8 (22)	9.6 (24)	8.8 (22)	1.2 (3.0)	0.6 (1.5)	0.0 (0.0)	0.0 (0.0)	0.0 (0.0)	0.0 (0.0)	0.1 (0.25)	2.8 (7.1)	12.5 (32)	44.4 (113)
Average precipitation days (≥ 0.01 in)	6.5	5.8	7.5	10.0	13.3	13.5	10.7	11.2	10.0	9.4	5.9	7.2	111.0
Average snowy days (≥ 0.1 in)	7.3	5.6	3.5	1.1	0.1	0.0	0.0	0.0	0.0	0.2	2.0	6.0	25.8
Source: NOAA

== Demographics ==
Historical population
Census	Pop.	Note	%±
1880	222		—
1890	291		31.1%
1900	347		19.2%
1910	272		−21.6%
1920	302		11.0%
1930	323		7.0%
1940	341		5.6%
1950	385		12.9%
1960	660		71.4%
1970	1,419		115.0%
1980	1,715		20.9%
1990	2,441		42.3%
2000	3,500		43.4%
2010	4,914		40.4%
2020	6,312		28.4%
2024 (est.)	6,809		7.9%
U.S. Decennial Census; 2020 Census

=== Racial and ethnic composition ===
Byron, Minnesota – racial and ethnic composition Note: the US Census treats Hispanic/Latino as an ethnic category. This table excludes Latinos from the racial categories and assigns them to a separate category. Hispanics/Latinos may be of any race.
Race / ethnicity (NH = non-Hispanic)
Race / ethnicity (NH = non-Hispanic)	Population 1990		Population 2000		Population 2010		Population 2020	
Race / ethnicity (NH = non-Hispanic)	Number	Percent	Number	Percent	Number	Percent	Number	Percent
White alone (NH)	2,412	98.81%	3,410	97.43%	4,666	94.95%	5,742	90.97%
Black or African American alone (NH)	4	0.16%	8	0.23%	34	0.69%	52	0.82%
Native American or Alaska Native alone (NH)	7	0.29%	7	0.20%	4	0.08%	7	0.11%
Asian alone (NH)	13	0.53%	31	0.89%	49	1.00%	109	1.73%
Pacific Islander alone (NH)	—	—	1	0.03%	5	0.10%	4	0.06%
Other race alone (NH)	0	0.00%	1	0.03%	2	0.04%	15	0.24%
Mixed race or multiracial (NH)	—	—	11	0.31%	66	1.34%	217	3.44%
Hispanic or Latino (any race)	5	0.20%	31	0.89%	88	1.79%	166	2.63%
Total	2,441	100.00%	3,500	100.00%	4,914	100.00%	6,312	100.00%

According to realtor website Zillow, the average price of a home as of November 30, 2025, in Byron is $388,180.

=== Demographic estimates ===
As of the 2023 American Community Survey, there are 2,421 estimated households in Byron with an average of 2.69 persons per household. The city has a median household income of $121,681. Approximately 6.2% of the city's population lives at or below the poverty line. Byron has an estimated 69.3% employment rate, with 49.5% of the population holding a bachelor's degree or higher and 99.3% holding a high school diploma. There were 2,453 housing units at an average density of 774.31 per square mile (299.0/km^{2}).

The top five reported languages (people were allowed to report up to two languages, thus the figures will generally add to more than 100%) were English (98.3%), Spanish (0.1%), Indo-European (0.3%), Asian and Pacific Islander (1.3%), and Other (0.0%).

The median age in the city was 36.8 years.

=== 2020 census ===
As of the 2020 census, Byron had a population of 6,312 and 1,712 families. The median age was 35.7 years. 31.0% of residents were under the age of 18 and 10.8% of residents were 65 years of age or older. For every 100 females there were 95.4 males, and for every 100 females age 18 and over there were 91.1 males age 18 and over.

The population density was 2,077.00 inhabitants per square mile (801.9/km^{2}). There were 2,382 housing units at an average density of 783.81 per square mile (302.6/km^{2}). Of all housing units, 5.5% were vacant. The homeowner vacancy rate was 1.3% and the rental vacancy rate was 16.6%.

100.0% of residents lived in urban areas, while 0.0% lived in rural areas.

There were 2,250 households in Byron, of which 44.2% had children under the age of 18 living in them. Of all households, 60.7% were married-couple households, 12.0% were households with a male householder and no spouse or partner present, and 21.0% were households with a female householder and no spouse or partner present. About 19.0% of all households were made up of individuals and 7.2% had someone living alone who was 65 years of age or older.

=== 2010 census ===
As of the 2010 census, there were 4,914 people, 1,796 households, and 1,366 families residing in the city. The population density was 1,688.66 inhabitants per square mile (652.0/km^{2}). There were 1,891 housing units at an average density of 649.83 per square mile (250.9/km^{2}). The racial makeup of the city was 96.17% White, 0.71% African American, 0.08% Native American, 1.00% Asian, 0.12% Pacific Islander, 0.51% from some other races and 1.40% from two or more races. Hispanic or Latino people of any race were 1.79% of the population.

There were 1,796 households, of which 44.7% had children under the age of 18 living with them, 60.7% were married couples living together, 11.6% had a female householder with no husband present, 3.8% had a male householder with no wife present, and 23.9% were non-families. 18.9% of all households were made up of individuals, and 4.6% had someone living alone who was 65 years of age or older. The average household size was 2.73 and the average family size was 3.15.

The median age in the city was 33.1 years. 31.1% of residents were under the age of 18; 7.4% were between the ages of 18 and 24; 29.8% were from 25 to 44; 24.3% were from 45 to 64; and 7.3% were 65 years of age or older. The gender makeup of the city was 49.4% male and 50.6% female.

== Transportation ==
Byron has in town and local community to community transportation provided by Rolling Hills Transit. The transportation is fare based and rides can be scheduled by calling their office or visiting their website at rhtbus.com.

A commuter bus service to Rochester is operated by Rochester City Lines and has three trips daily through Byron each day. Two of those three go directly to a park-and-ride lot on the eastern edge of town, while the third zigzags through the city to pick up riders.

The DM&E rail line was originally built by the Winona and St. Peter Railroad, which reached west through town to neighboring Kasson in 1865. The station was west of what is now Byron Avenue and was rebuilt in 1883. The Chicago and North Western Railway gained control of the Winona and St. Peter a few years after the line reached Byron. The C&NW operated the line until the 1980s, when it was spun off to create the DM&E.

== Community and government ==
Byron has a mayor and a four-member city council. There are also four other government boards including an economic development authority and a park board. Byron City Hall is near the elementary school on 10th Avenue. It is also a fairly new structure. The old city hall is in the center of town at Byron Avenue and 4th Street and was built in 1938. The city's first water tower was built next to that location in 1935 and torn down around 2004. The Byron city flag consists of three stripes of blue, white, and green. It has five stars on the top blue stripe, and a bear in the center of the white stripe. The flag's design was chosen in a citywide contest, and the winning design was designed by Jeff and Allison Ihrke.

The weekly Byron Review newspaper covers city events. It is owned by Community News Corporation, which also operates papers in Hayfield and Dodge Center.

=== Education ===
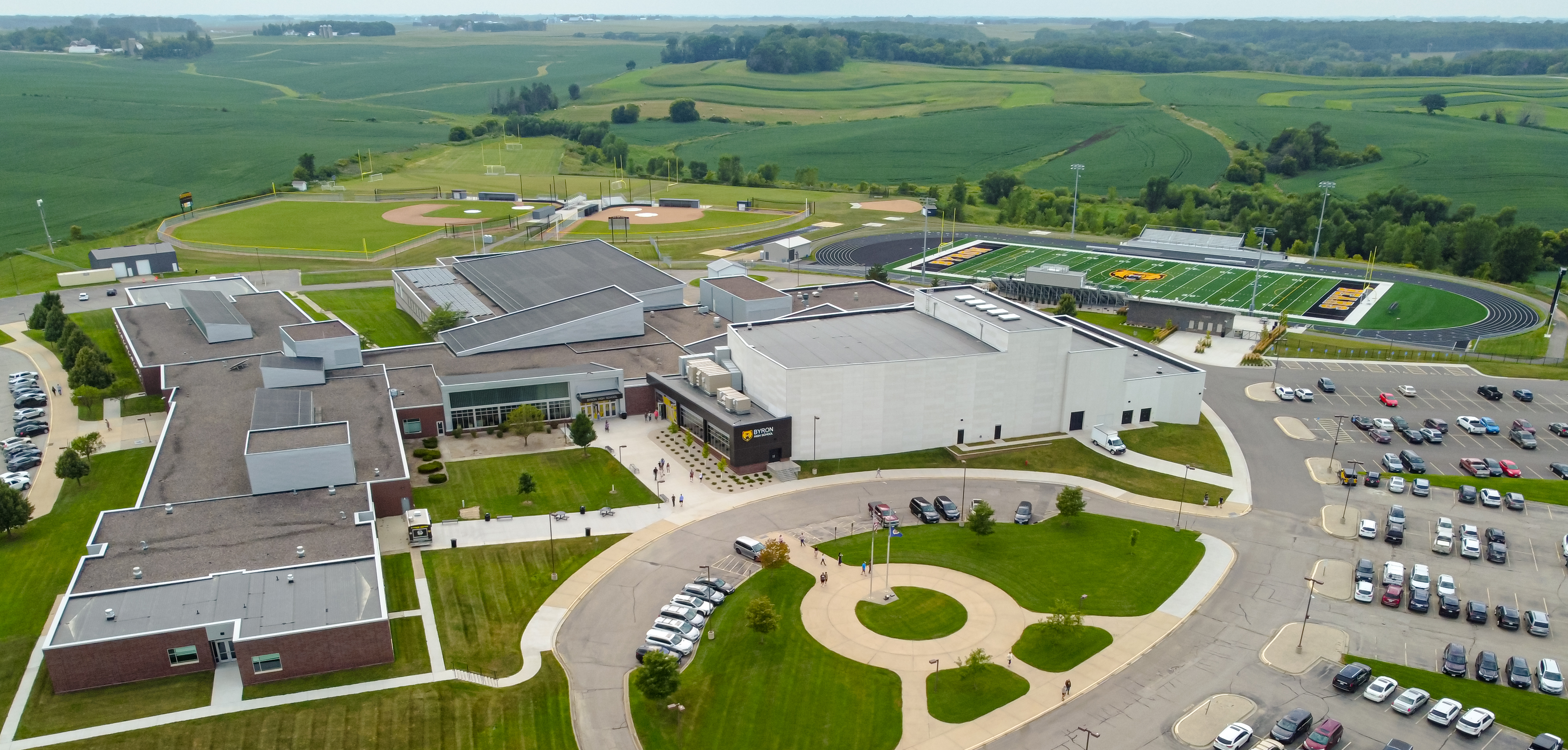
Byron High School

The Byron Public Schools (ISD #531) serves the community of Byron, has five public schools. Byron High School's mascot is the "Bears". 2023-2024 enrollment was 689 students.

- Byron Community Education (Preschool–Pre-kindergarten)
- Byron Primary School (Kindergarten–2nd grades)
- Byron Intermediate School (3rd–5th grades)
- Byron Middle School (6th–8th grades)
- Byron High School (9th–12th grades)

== Parks and recreation ==
=== Parks ===
One of the major parks in the county, Oxbow Park and Zollman Zoo, is 3.5 miles north of town. The zoo has dozens of animals from 30 different native species, including a number of birds, a mountain lion, wolves, otters, white-tailed deer, and some bison.

Byron has several city parks, a public pool open in the summer, and many recreational fields, such as soccer and baseball fields.

=== Golf ===
Byron is home to Somerby Golf Club and Community, a private golf club and community on the north side of the city. Links of Byron was a nine-hole public course that closed in 2015.
