= Harbine, Kansas =

Unincorporated community in Republic County, Kansas

Coordinates: 39°59′58″N 97°46′06″W

Harbine is an unincorporated community in Republic County, Kansas, United States. It is located south of Byron, Nebraska on the south side of the Nebraska state line.

== History ==
The community was originally founded as Harbine straddling the Nebraska-Kansas state border, and under the latter name was platted in 1877 when it was certain that the B&M Railroad would be extended to that point. When it was discovered in 1889 another post office in Nebraska was named Harbine, the community was renamed to Byron in order to avoid repetition. The post office in Harbine closed in 1883. Currently, the south side of the state border is named Harbine, Kansas and the north side is named Byron, Nebraska.

== Education ==
The community is served by Republic County USD 109 public school district.
