= Rochester Public Transit =

Provider of mass transportation in Olmsted County, Minnesota

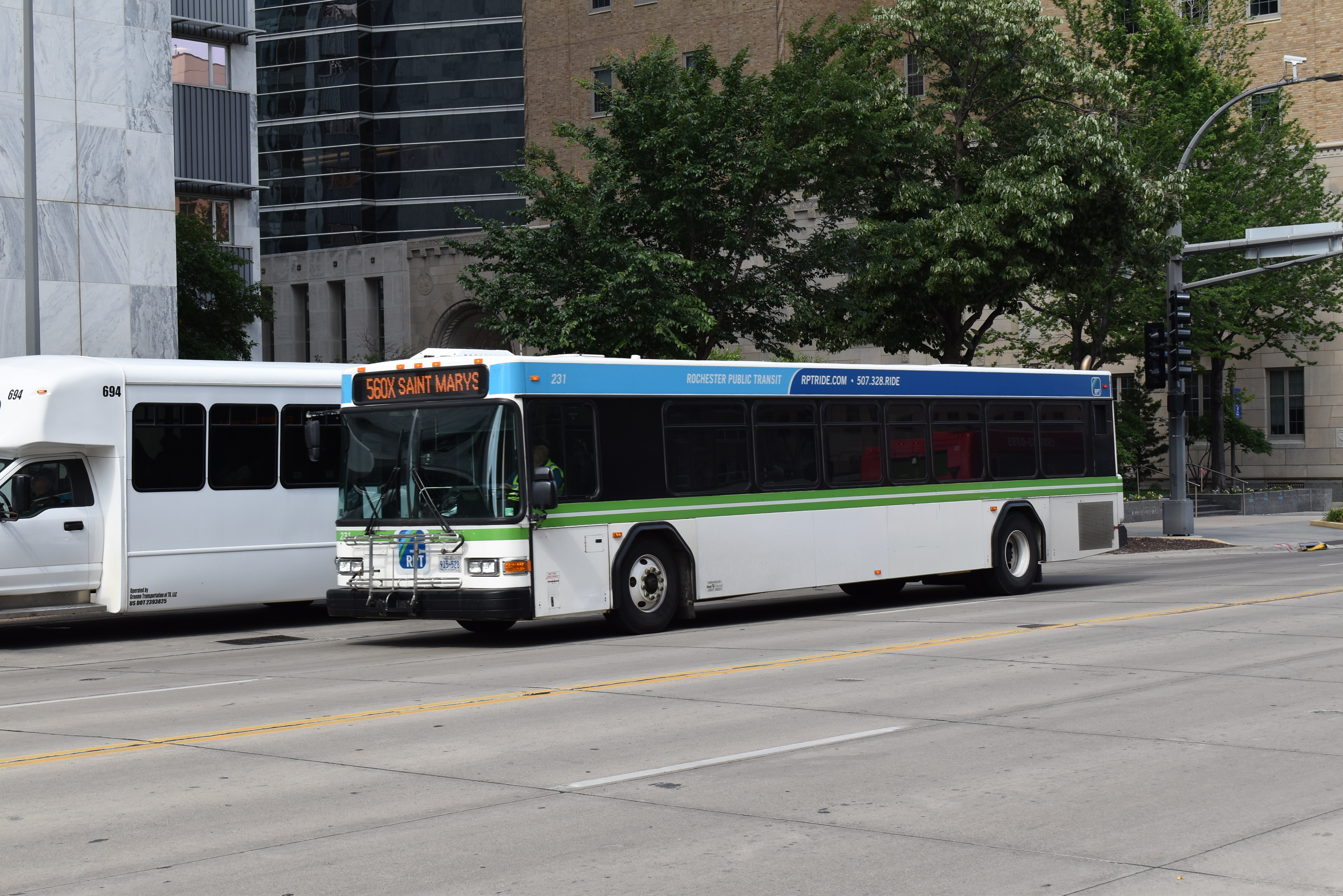
- A bus serving route 560X in downtown Rochester
- Locale: Rochester, Minnesota
- Service area: Olmsted County, Minnesota
- Service type: Bus service, paratransit
- Routes: 32
- Fleet: 68 buses
- Annual ridership: 955,000 (2022)
- Website: Rochester Public Transit

Rochester Public Transit (RPT) is the primary provider of mass transportation in Olmsted County, Minnesota with routes serving the Rochester area. As of 2019, the system provided 2,155,230 rides over 132,686 annual vehicle revenue hours with 68 buses and 10 demand response vehicles.

RPT is currently constructing a 2.6 mile bus rapid transit (BRT) line for downtown Rochester, Minnesota. The line named, Link, will a connect downtown Rochester, Mayo Clinic's downtown campus, Mayo Clinic's Saint Mary's campus, University of Minnesota Rochester, and a new 13-acre transit-oriented development at the western terminus. As of March 2025, construction has begun for the Link BRT project and the anticipated project completion is the end of 2026.

== History ==
Prior to 2012, the bus service serving the Rochester area was Rochester City Lines operated by Richfield Bus Company. Due to a federal requirement for funding however, the city of Rochester was required to put the bus line on bid. Due to First Transit submitting a lower bid than RCL, the city contracted with First, which effectively ended RCL local fixed-route operations in Rochester after over 45 years. Rochester Public Transit introduced its first battery electric buses and its first 60-foot articulated buses in July 2022. The buses were placed in service on the 560X route, where they will save the agency approximately 11,000 gallons of diesel fuel annually.

== Service ==
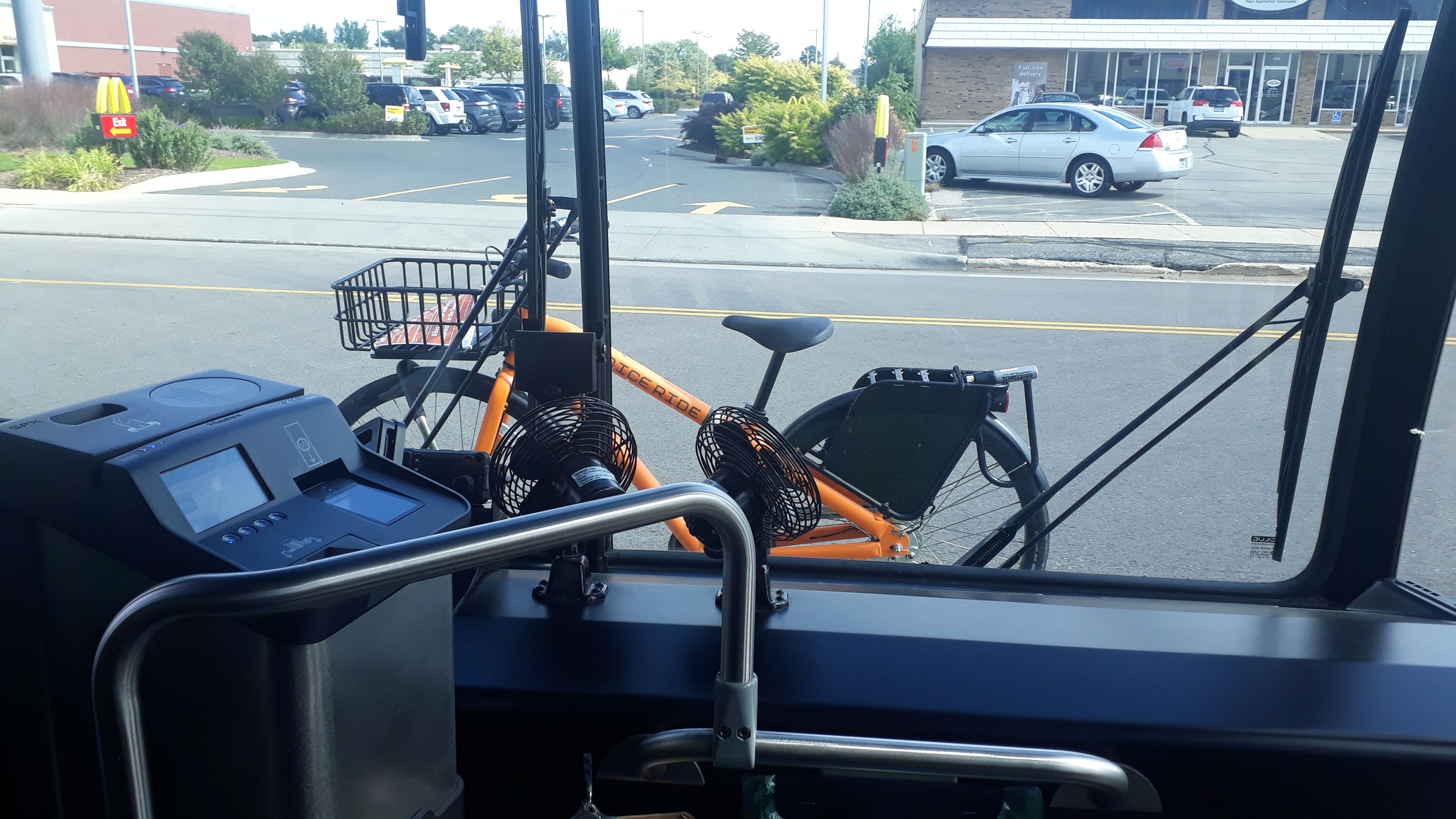
A bike rack on a Rochester Public Transit bus

Rochester Public Transit operates on a pulse system from the transfer hub situated on 2nd Street SW between Broadway Avenue and 4th Avenue SW. Hours of operation for regular routes are Monday through Friday from 5:00 A.M. to 10:36 P.M. Saturday and Sunday service runs from 6:30 A.M. to 7:36 P.M.

Connections to intercity public transit are available from the downtown transfer point. Jefferson Lines buses to Minneapolis or Milwaukee stop four blocks south at 205 6th St. SW.

As of 2022, single fares are set at $2.00 for adults, $1.00 for youths and seniors, and free for children. In addition, 10-ride tickets, 20-ride tickets and various passes are available.

== Link bus rapid transit ==
Link, formerly known as Rochester Rapid Transit and the Downtown Circulator, is a bus rapid transit (BRT) line under construction for downtown Rochester, Minnesota. The 2.6 mile route will connect downtown Rochester, Mayo Clinic's downtown campus, Mayo Clinic's Saint Mary's campus, University of Minnesota Rochester, and a new 13-acre transit-oriented development at the western terminus.

As of March 2025, construction has begun for the Link BRT project and the anticipated project completion is the end of 2026.

== Fixed route ridership ==
The ridership statistics shown here are of fixed route services only and do not include demand response services.
