= John Byrom (disambiguation) =

John Byrom may refer to:

- John Byrom (1692–1763), English poet, inventor of a shorthand system
- John Byrom (footballer) (b. 1944), English footballer
- John Byrom (cricketer) (1851–1931), English cricketer
- John Byrom (swimmer) (born 1947), Australian swimmer
