= Byrde M. Vaughan =

American politician and lawyer

Byrde M. Vaughan (November 30, 1862 – May 10, 1941) was an American politician and lawyer.

Born in the town of Byron, Fond du Lac County, Wisconsin, Vaughan moved to Rudolph, Wisconsin to live with his grandfather in 1867. He graduated from Howe High School in 1880 and received his bachelor's degree from the University of Wisconsin in 1885. Vaughan worked in the law office of Robert M. La Follette, Sr. and studied at the University of Wisconsin Law School, receiving his law degree in 1888. Vaughan then practiced law in Wisconsin Rapids, Wisconsin and farmed. He served as superintendent of the public schools and on the Wisconsin Rapids Board of Education. Vaughan also served on the Wood County Board of Supervisors. From 1933 to 1939, Vaughan served in the Wisconsin State Assembly and was a member of the Wisconsin Progressive Party. He served in the Wisconsin National Guard in the Gardner Rifles Company. Vaughan died suddenly of a heart attack at his home in Wisconsin Rapids. He was buried in Forest Hill Cemetery in Wisconsin Rapids.
