= Listed buildings in Byram cum Sutton =

Byram cum Sutton is a civil parish in the county of North Yorkshire, England. It contains twelve listed buildings that are recorded in the National Heritage List for England. All the listed buildings are designated at Grade II, the lowest of the three grades, which is applied to "buildings of national importance and special interest". The parish contains the village of Byram, the hamlet of Sutton, and the surrounding area. The most important building in the parish was Byram Hall but, apart from its service wing, it was demolished by 1955. Other than a lodge in the village of Byram, and a farmhouse and a farm building, all the listed buildings are associated with the hall, and are in its gardens and grounds.

== Buildings ==
Name and location	Photograph	Date	Notes
Gate piers north of the Orangery, Byram Park; 53.73169°N 1.24389°W		Late 17th century	A pair of gate piers in sandstone, with a square plan, about 2 metres (6 ft 7 in) high. Each pier has indented panels, over which is a shield and a cornice.
Byram Farmhouse; 53.72814°N 1.23472°W	—	Late 18th century	The farmhouse, which was designed by John Carr, is rendered, with stone dressings, floor bands, and hipped Welsh slate roofs. There are two storeys, and three bays, the middle bay projecting slightly. In the centre is a doorway with a pediment flanked by narrow casement windows, above which is a tripartite window, a low parapet and a cornice with ball finials. Each outer bay has a two-storey arch containing sash windows with sill bands.
Barn and cartshed, Byram Farm; 53.72832°N 1.23422°W	—	Late 18th century	The farm buildings, which were designed by John Carr, are in partly rendered magnesian limestone with cogged brick eaves. The barn has a corrugated iron roof, and the cartshed has a hipped Welsh slate roof. The cartshed has six bays, and the barn is arcaded, with eight bays forming a hay barn and the others a threshing barn. Apart from a segmental-headed entrance, the arches have round heads. The piers to the arches have square capitals, and on the roof is a weathervane in the form of a cow.
Coach house and stables, Byram Park; 53.72958°N 1.24756°W		Late 18th century	The coach house and stables to Byram Hall were designed by John Carr. They are in brick and sandstone, and have hipped roofs of Welsh slate and asbestos. The buildings have two storeys and have an L-shaped plan, the stables forming a north range with three bays, and the coach house an east wing with seven bays. The middle three bays of the coach house project, and in the centre is a round carriage arch with a moulded archivolt, the flanking bays with round-arched windows in moulded archivolts. The outer bays contain round carriage arches with impost bands. In the upper floor are sash windows with flat arches of gauged brick. The stables contain blind arcading and round-arched stable openings.
Lodge, Byram Park; 53.72462°N 1.26378°W	—	Late 18th century	The lodge is in limewashed stone on a plinth, with a stepped low parapet and a Welsh slate roof. There is a square plan, a single storey and a single bay, the centre of each side slightly projecting. The central doorway has a plain architrave, a frieze and a pediment. On the sides are windows, each in an architrave, with an apron, a frieze and a pediment.
Orangery, Byram Park; 53.73111°N 1.24292°W	—	Late 18th century	The orangery was designed by John Carr, and has been converted into a private house. It is in rendered sandstone and brick, on a plinth, with a frieze, a dentilled cornice, an openwork parapet with faceted finials, and a Welsh slate roof. There is a single storey and five bays. It has an arcade with moulded round arches, a glazed entrance and multi-paned windows.
Service wing, Byram Hall; 53.72950°N 1.24814°W		Late 18th century	The service wing is the only surviving part of Byram Hall, and was designed by John Carr. It is in rendered brick and sandstone, with dressings in stone and red gauged brick, a cornice and a low parapet. There are three storeys and nine bays. In the ground floor, alternate bays contain doorways and sash windows, and the upper floors contain sash windows with flat brick arches.
Footbridge, Byram Park; 53.73062°N 1.24057°W		1825	The footbridge crosses a lake in the grounds. The piers are in stone and brick. The bridge has three segmental arches in cast iron and wood, with pointed arcading to the spandrels, quatrefoil decoration above the piers, and a latticework parapet.
East wall of walled garden, Byram Park; 53.73113°N 1.24389°W	—	Mid 19th century	The wall is in sandstone with dressings in stone and marble, and it is coped. It is on a plinth, and contains a monumental gateway with paired pilasters, a round arch with a ram's head keystone, a decorated frieze, a dentilled cornice surmounted by a segmental pedimented plaque with flanking volutes between finials. There is also an entrance with a plain surround, containing four niches with Ionic pilasters and archivolts with keystones.
Gateway, railings, wall and piers, Byram Park; 53.73100°N 1.24362°W	—	Mid 19th century	The walls and piers are in sandstone, and the railings and gates are in cast iron. The central entrance has piers with a square plan, decorated with a carved basket. At the corners are ram's heads with swags carrying a cornice, and pyramidal caps with pineapple finials.
Gateway west of the service wing, Byram Hall; 53.72928°N 1.24864°W	—	Mid 19th century	The monumental gateway is in sandstone and in Jacobethan style. The scrolled gate is in cast iron, and has a rusticated round-arched surround and a mask keystone. The pilasters have decorative capitals with ram's heads, a cornice, and an ornamental infilled strapwork crown rising to a pinnacle, with ball finials on the corners.
Ha-ha and wall south of the Orangery, Byram Park; 53.73080°N 1.24278°W	—	19th century	The ha-ha and the wall are in stone, and both have a central flight of steps. The ha-ha is about 1.5 metres (4 ft 11 in) high, and has curved coping, piers at the openings, and pyramidal caps with faceted finials. The wall is about 1 metre (3 ft 3 in) high, on a plinth, with moulded coping, and end piers with similar finials. On the walls by the steps are scrolls.
