= Byram Park =

Former country estate in Byram, North Yorkshire, England

Coordinates: 53°43′46″N 1°14′52″W

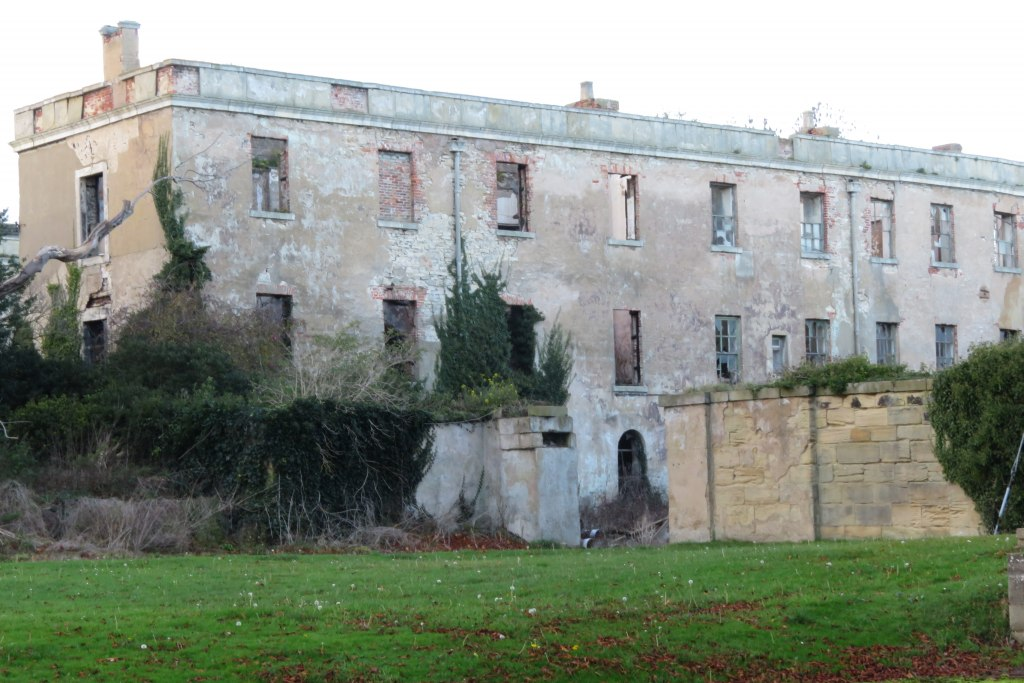
The surviving wing of Byram Hall, in 2020

Byram Park is a former country estate in Byram, North Yorkshire, a village in England.

The estate was acquired by the Ramsden family in 1618. Byram Hall, at the heart of the park, had been built in the 16th century, and was altered by its new owners. In 1762, John Carr of York redesigned the building, giving it facades in the Neoclassical style. It had a three-storey main front, and two-storey wings, with the west wing having 15 bays. In 1780, Robert Adam made internal alterations to the building. The family sold the estate in the 1920s, following which part of the building was demolished, with most of the remainder following in 1947. The east service wing survived until it burnt down in the 1980s. The west service wing survives, as do several associated buildings, and most features of the park.

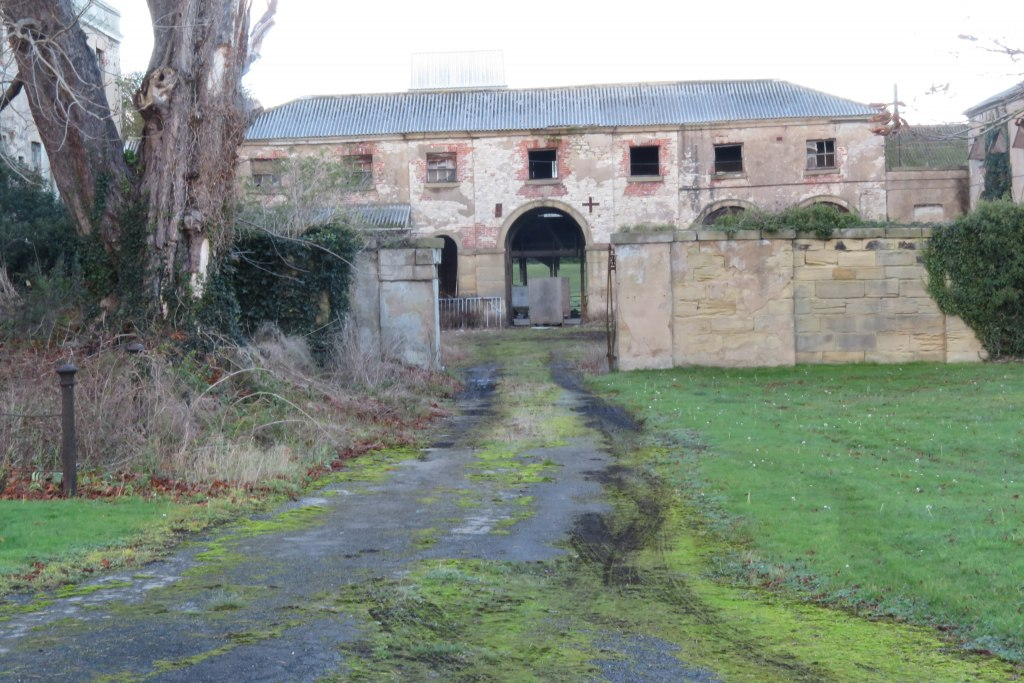
The coach house, in 2020

The surviving service wing is built of rendered brick and sandstone, with dressings in stone and red gauged brick, a cornice and a low parapet. There are three storeys and nine bays. In the ground floor, alternate bays contain doorways and sash windows, and the upper floors contain sash windows with flat brick arches. It is in poor condition and is not inhabited, but is Grade II listed. Nearby is the coach house and stable block, also designed by John Carr, and disused due to mining subsidence. The structure is built of brick and sandstone, and has hipped roofs of Welsh slate and asbestos. The building has two storeys and an L-shaped plan, the stables forming a north range with three bays, and the coach house an east wing with seven bays. The middle three bays of the coach house project, and in the centre is a round carriage arch with a moulded archivolt, the flanking bays with round-arched windows in moulded archivolts. The outer bays contain round carriage arches with impost bands. In the upper floor are sash windows with flat arches of gauged brick. The stables contain blind arcading and round-arched stable openings.

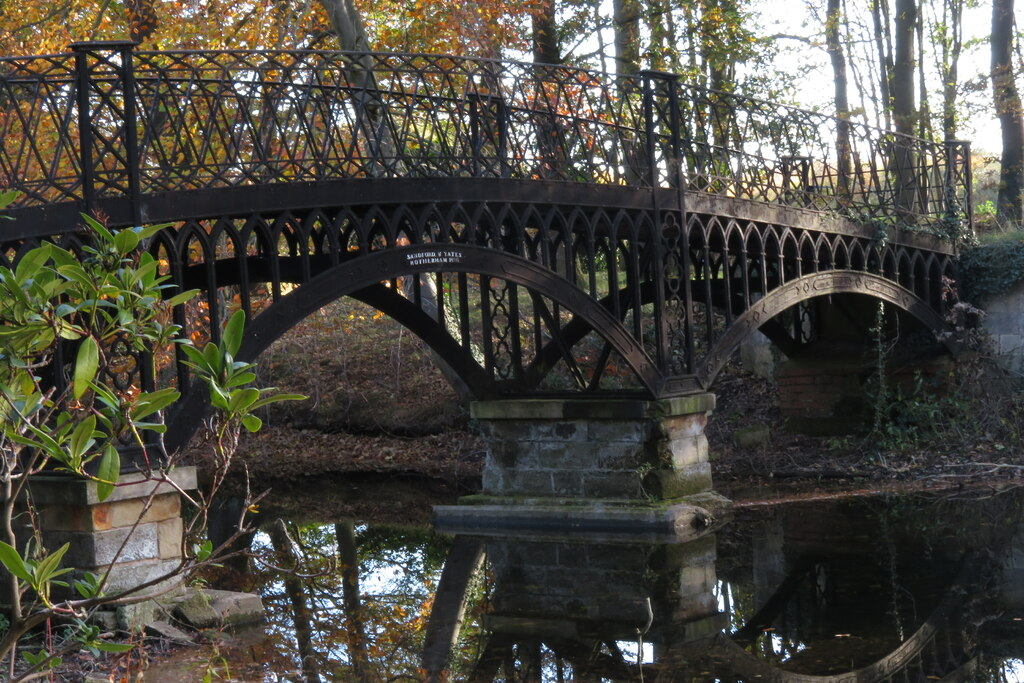
The footbridge over the lake

The park and gardens were in existence by the early 18th century. Capability Brown was commissioned in 1782 to produce a plan for their redevelopment, but he died the following year and it is not known whether he completed the plan or whether it was carried out. Over the next few years, a lake was constructed, and many trees were removed from the deer park. In the mid 19th century, more woodland was planted, the lake was redesigned, and pleasure grounds were created to its north, including formal gardens and greenhouses. Following the sale of the estate, the parkland was converted to farmland, and much of the woodland was removed, but the lake and kitchen garden survive. A bridge over the lake, built in 1825, is Grade II listed. The piers are in stone and brick. The bridge has three segmental arches in cast iron and wood, with pointed arcading to the spandrels, quatrefoil decoration above the piers, and a latticework parapet.

Within the pleasure grounds, there is a Grade II listed orangery. It was designed by John Carr in the late-18th century, and has been converted into a private house. It is in rendered sandstone and brick, on a plinth, with a frieze, a dentilled cornice, an openwork parapet with faceted finials, and a Welsh slate roof. There is a single storey and five bays. It has an arcade with moulded round arches, a glazed entrance and multi-paned windows. The walls of the formal gardens and kitchen garden survive, the areas linked by tunnels, designed to allow gardeners to move between them.

In addition, two lodges survive. One, originally half of a matching pair, is Grade II listed and has been attributed to Carr. It is built of limewashed stone on a plinth, with a stepped low parapet and a Welsh slate roof. There is a square plan, a single storey and a single bay, the centre of each side slightly projecting. The central doorway has a plain architrave, a frieze and a pediment. On the sides are windows, each in an architrave, with an apron, a frieze and a pediment. The other, the North Lodge, was built in the mid 19th century, and was restored and extended in the 1960s.

== See also ==
- Listed buildings in Byram cum Sutton
