= Bryony (given name) =

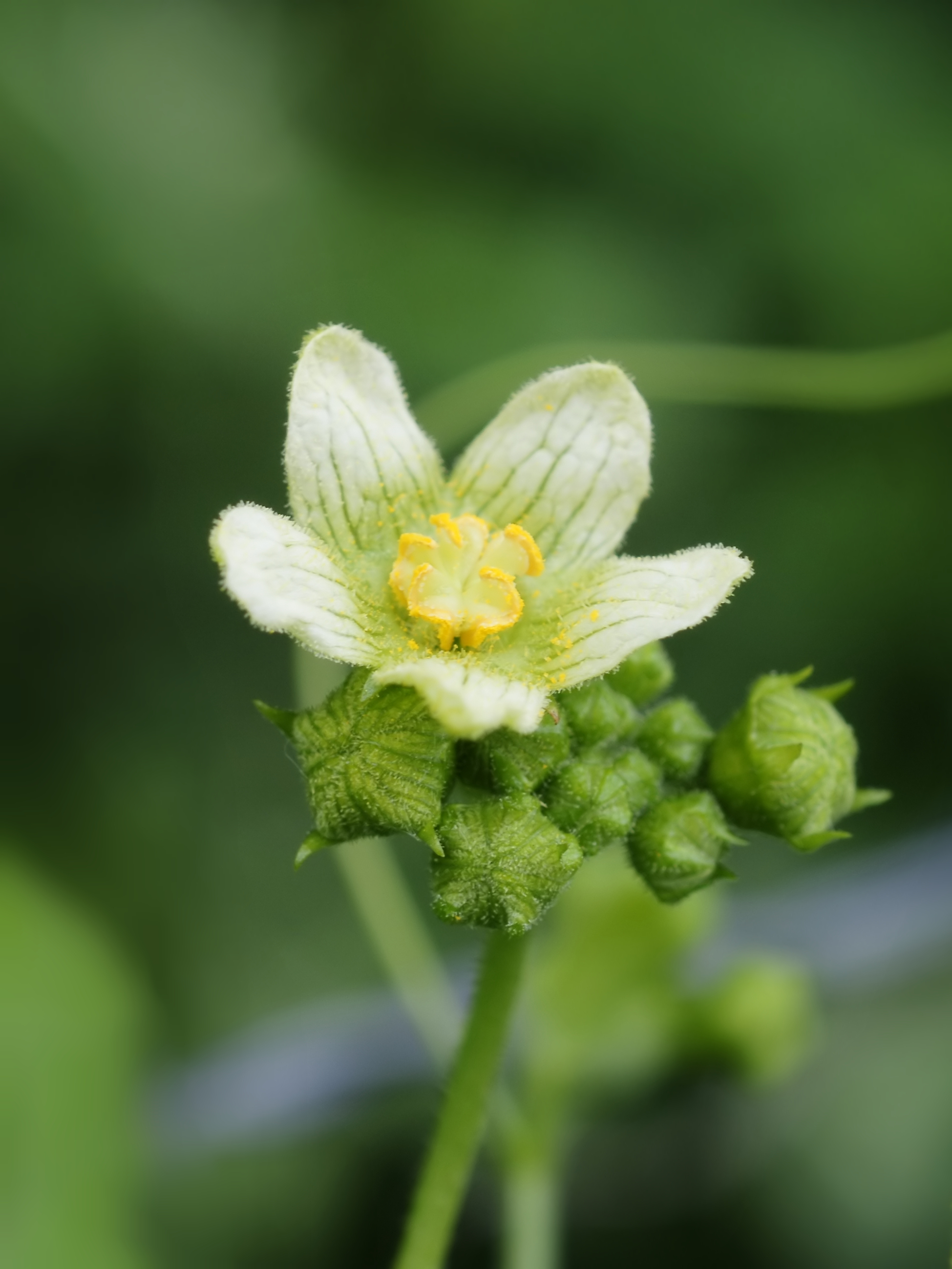
- European white bryony in flower in Belgium in 2008.
- Gender: Female

Origin
- Language: English
- Meaning: bryony

Bryony or Briony is a feminine given name derived from the name of the plant. It may refer to:

- Bryony Afferson (born 1983), British actress and musician
- Briony Akle (born c. 1977), Australian netball player and coach
- Bryony Botha (born 1997), New Zealand cyclist
- Bryony Brind (1960–2015), British ballerina
- Briony Cole (born 1983), Australian diver
- Bryony Coles (born 1946), British archaeologist
- Bryony Corrigan (born 1992), British actress and comedian in Mischief Theatre
- Bryony Frost (born 1995), British jockey
- Bryony Gordon (born 1980), British journalist
- Bryony Griffith (born 1977), British musician
- Bryony Hannah (born 1984), British actress
- Bryony Kimmings (born 1981), British artist
- Bryony Lavery (born 1947), British dramatist
- Briony McRoberts (1957–2013), English actress
- Bryony Marks (born c. 1971), Australian screen composer
- Bryony Page (born 1990), British gymnast
- Briony Penn (born 1960), Canadian author and environmental activist
- Briony Scott (born 1963), Australian educator and columnist
- Bryony Shaw (born 1983), British windsurfer
- Bryony van Velzen (born 1996), Dutch cyclist
- Bryony Worthington, Baroness Worthington (born 1971), British environmentalist
