= Byron High School =

Byron High School may refer to:

- Byron High School (Byron, Illinois), Byron, Illinois
- Byron High School (Byron, Michigan), Byron, Michigan (part of the Byron Area Schools District)
- Byron High School (Byron, Minnesota), Byron, Minnesota
- Byron Center High School, Byron Center, Michigan
- Port Byron High School, Port Byron, New York
- Byron-Beorgen High School, Bergen, New York
- Byron Bay High School, Byron Bay, Australia
