= Byron Young =

Byron Young may refer to:

- Byron Young (linebacker) (born 1998), American football linebacker
- Byron Young (defensive lineman) (born 2000), American football defensive lineman
