= Byron, Nevada =

Ghost town in Nevada, US

Coordinates: 36°36′49″N 114°40′51″W

Byron is an extinct town in Clark County, in the U.S. state of Nevada. The community was about 44 miles (71 km) north of Las Vegas.

== History ==
Byron had about 10 inhabitants at the year 1941, at which time it was a depot on the Union Pacific Railroad. Byron was abandoned by 1949.
