= Byron Township =

Byron Township may refer to:

- Byron Township, Illinois
- Byron Township, Buchanan County, Iowa
- Byron Township, Kansas, in Stafford County, Kansas
- Byron Township, North Dakota, in Cavalier County, North Dakota
- Byron Township, Michigan
- Byron Township, Cass County, Minnesota
- Byron Township, Waseca County, Minnesota
