= South Byron, Wisconsin =

- Unincorporated community
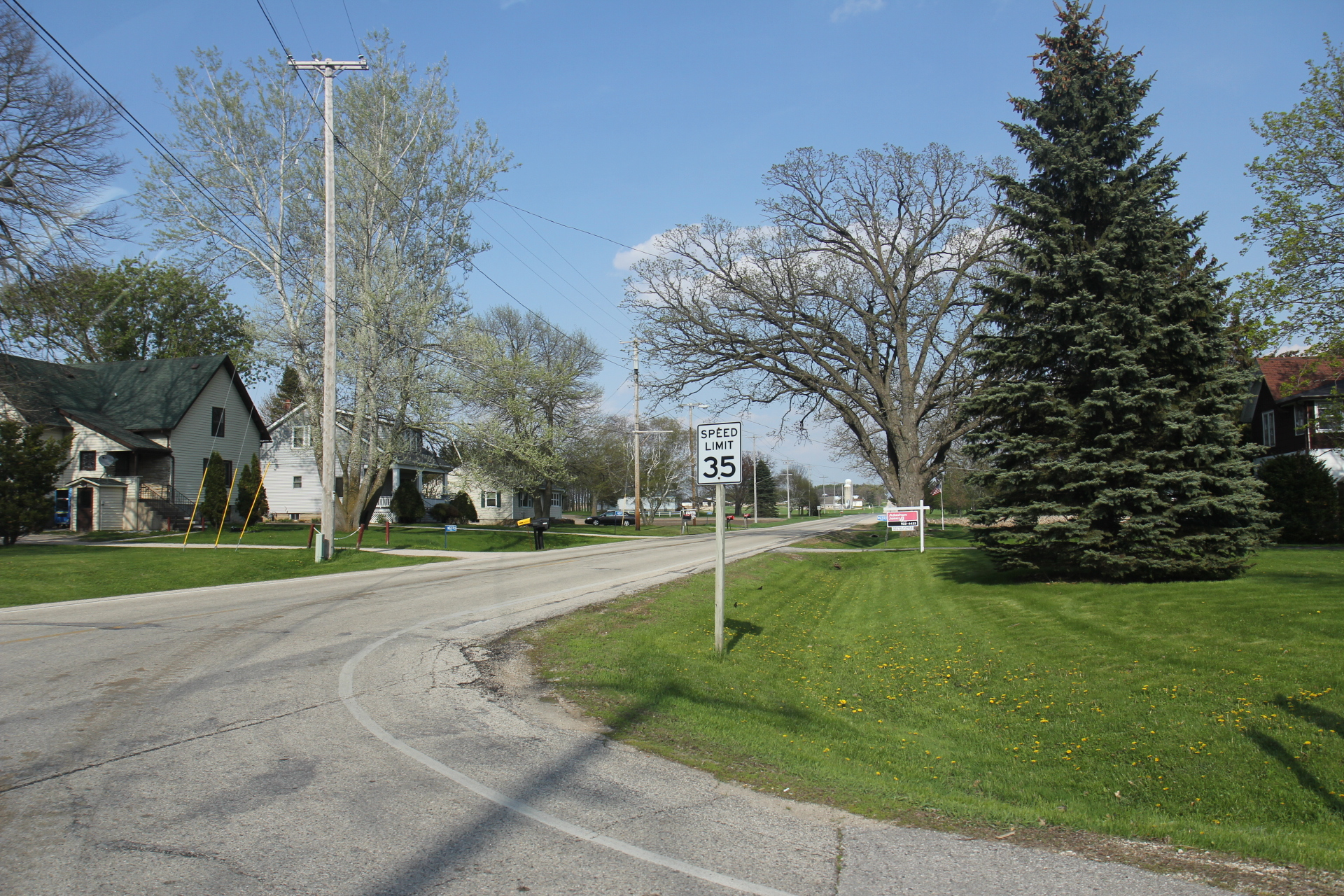
- Looking east in South Byron

- Location within Wisconsin Location within the United States
- Coordinates: 43°38′20″N 88°29′11″W
- Country: United States
- State: Wisconsin
- County: Fond du Lac
- Elevation: 1,030 ft (310 m)
- Time zone: UTC-6 (Central (CST))
  - Summer (DST): UTC-5 (CDT)
- Area code: 920
- GNIS feature ID: 1574425

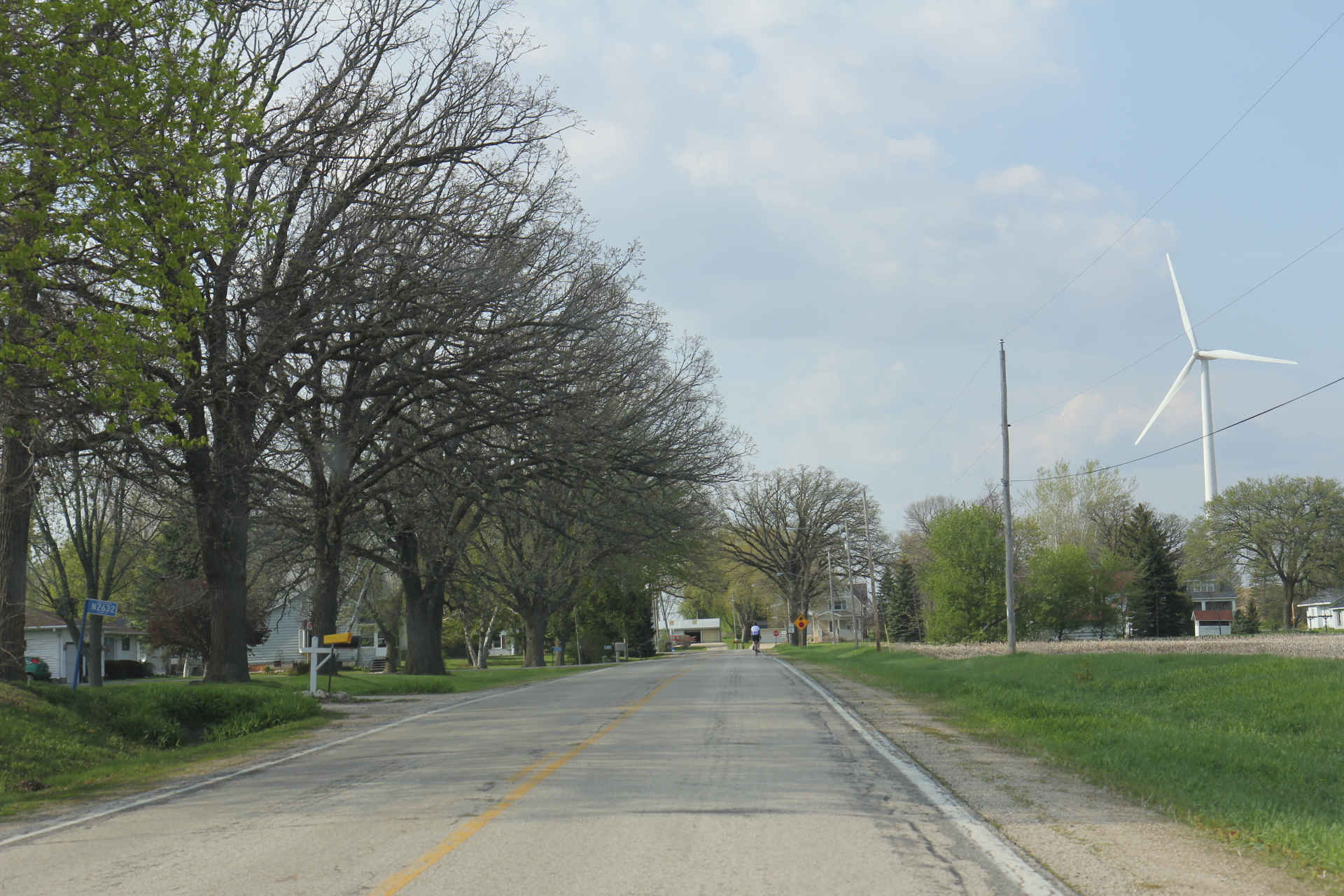
Looking north in South Byron

South Byron is an unincorporated community located in the town of Byron, in Fond du Lac County, Wisconsin, United States. South Byron is 1.5 miles (2.4 km) north of Brownsville.
