= Byron (crater) =

Crater on Mercury

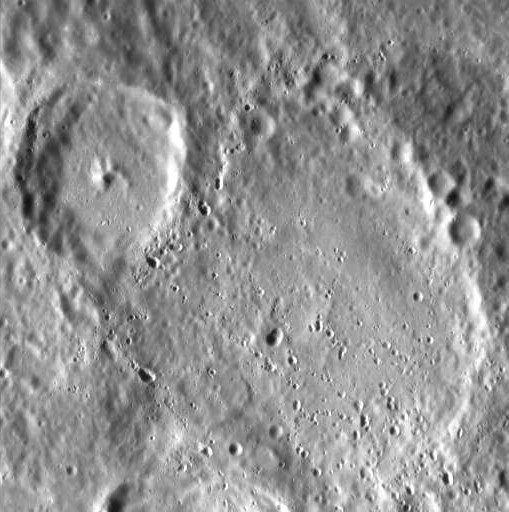
- MESSENGER NAC image of Byron
- Feature type: Impact crater
- Location: Kuiper quadrangle, Mercury
- Coordinates: 8.5°S 32.7°W
- Diameter: 106.58 km
- Eponym: Lord Byron

Byron is a crater on Mercury. It has a diameter of 106.58 kilometers. Its name was adopted by the International Astronomical Union (IAU) in 1976. Byron is named for the English poet Lord Byron, who lived from 1788 to 1824.
