= Geneviève Biron =

Canadian civil servant

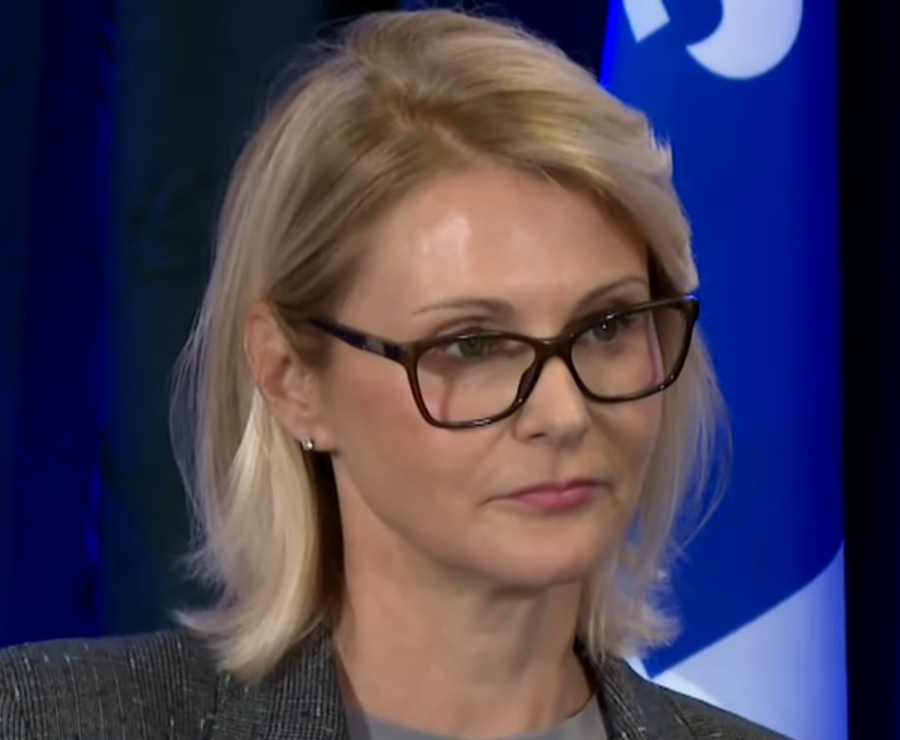
- Biron in 2024
- Citizenship: Canada
- Education: HEC Montréal; London Business School; Ivey Business School
- Occupations: senior civil servant, health company executive
- Employer: Santé Québec
- Board member of: Hydro-Quebec

Geneviève Biron is a senior civil servant from Quebec. Since April 2024, she has been president and CEO of Santé Québec, a Quebec health agency. Before her appointment to this position, she managed Biron Groupe Santé, a sleep clinic company, founded Imagix, a chain of medical imaging clinics, and Propulia Capital, a venture capital firm, and served on the board of directors of Hydro-Québec.

== Personal life ==
Biron was born into a family of businesspeople. Her father, Denis Biron, founded Biron Groupe Santé in 1952. Her sisters, Eve-Lyne and Caroline, also ran the family business at different times. Biron is married to Sylvain Poirier, a lawyer and senior strategic advisor for the public health sector.

== Business career ==
Biron was head of Biron Groupe Santé, a family health services business, from 2014 to 2021. Before that, she held other positions at the company, including vice-president of operations from 1998 to 2005 and human resources director from 1990 to 1998. She founded Imagix, a chain of medical imaging clinics, which she ran from 2005 to 2014. After leaving Biron Groupe Santé, she founded Propulia Capital, a venture capital company investing in health and life sciences businesses, and was named to the board of directors of Hydro-Québec in 2021.

== Appointment as head of Santé Québec ==
On April 29, 2024, Biron was named president and CEO of Santé Québec, an agency created by the provincial government to be the sole employer of staff at health care institutions, replacing the network of integrated health centre corporations that operated the province's hospitals and related institutions. She was appointed to the job after a search by Mandrake, an executive search firm. Her annual salary for the first two years at Santé Québec will be $652,000, making her one of Quebec's highest-paid civil servants.

Biron's appointment was criticized by opposition political parties and labour unions, who feared that the private sector would have greater influence in the public healthcare system. Biron replied that she had no intention of favouring the private sector.

Biron has publicly argued in favour of creating a performance measurement to assess the public's confidence in the health care system and its ability to offer accessible and quality services.
