= Byron shipwreck =

Schooner that sank in Lake Michigan

- Byron (schooner) Shipwreck
- U.S. National Register of Historic Places
- Location within Wisconsin
- Location: Off the coast of Oostburg, Wisconsin
- Nearest city: Oostburg, Wisconsin
- Coordinates: 43°36′17.4″N 87°41′17.4″W
- Area: less than one acre
- Architectural style: schooner
- MPS: Great Lakes Shipwreck Sites of Wisconsin MPS
- NRHP reference No.: 09000368
- Added to NRHP: May 20, 2009

Byron was a schooner that sank in Lake Michigan off the coast of Oostburg, Wisconsin, United States. In 2009 the shipwreck site was added to the National Register of Historic Places.

== History ==
The commercial vessel Byron, a small undocumented 36-foot (11 m) schooner, was built c. 1849 and sailed under the command of Captain William Burmeister of Manitowoc, Wisconsin. In 1867 she was run down and sunk by the Canton, another schooner. At the time of the loss, the Byron was valued at about $1,000, and the cargo at $400.

The Byron now lies in 135 feet (41 m) of water 12 miles (19 km) southeast of Sheboygan, Wisconsin. The wreckage was discovered by commercial fisherman Danny Burnette in 1977 when a trawl net brought up an anchor. Divers soon located the wreck site, much of the Byron's cargo and equipment was recovered by recreational divers over the next few years. No cargo or artifacts remain; the Byron is completely covered with a layer of zebra and quagga mussels and the hull is very fragile.

The Byron is significant as a rare example of its type of commercial vessel, once common to Wisconsin's transportation infrastructure and a vital part of its economy in the time before road and rail networks. There is no surviving historical record of the construction techniques of lakeshoring schooners, making the Byron site a potential source of additional information on this type of 19th century vessel.
