= Henry Biron =

English cricketer and clergyman

Personal information
- Full name: Henry Brydges Biron
- Born: 13 June 1835; Lympne, Kent
- Died: 7 April 1915 (aged 79); Barham, Kent
- Batting: Right-handed

Domestic team information
- Years: Team
- 1857–1864: Kent

Career statistics
| Competition | First-class |
|---|---|
| Matches | 20 |
| Runs scored | 314 |
| Batting average | 10.46 |
| 100s/50s | 0/1 |
| Top score | 53 |
| Balls bowled | 96 |
| Wickets | 2 |
| Bowling average | 32.00 |
| 5 wickets in innings | 0 |
| 10 wickets in match | 0 |
| Best bowling | 1/29 |
| Catches/stumpings | 9/– |
- Source: CricInfo, 1 April 2017

Henry Brydges Biron (13 June 1835 – 7 April 1915) was an English clergyman and amateur cricketer. He played first-class cricket for Kent County Cricket Club and for amateur teams between 1857 and 1864. He was born at Lympne in Kent and died at Derringstone near Barham, also in Kent in 1915 aged 79.

The son of the rector of Lympne, Biron was educated at The King's School, Canterbury and Trinity Hall, Cambridge. He matriculated (as Henry Brydges) in 1854 and graduated from Cambridge University in 1858. He played in a trial match in 1857 for the University cricket team but did not appear in any first-class matches for the team. Later that same cricket season he appeared in a county match for Kent for the first time, and also for the Gentlemen of Kent and Sussex.

He played in a total of 20 first-class matches over the next eight years, 15 times for Kent. He did not appear in first-class cricket after the 1864 season, though he continued to play in amateur matches until 1869. In 1864 he made the first score of 200 runs or more in any match held in Sussex, scoring 214 for Quidnuncs Cricket Club against the Gentlemen of Sussex, at Brighton.

Biron was ordained as a deacon in 1859 and as a priest in 1860. He served as curate at Mersham between 1859 and 1868, at Biddenden between 1868 and 1878 and at Harbledown between 1878 and 1882. He then became, like his father, Rector of Lympne and West Hythe until his retirement in 1912.

== Bibliography ==
- Carlaw, Derek (2020). Kent County Cricketers, A to Z: Part One (1806–1914) (PDF). Cardiff: ACS.
