= Biron =

Biron may refer to:

== Places ==
=== France ===
- Biron, Charente-Maritime, in the Charente-Maritime department
- Biron, Dordogne, in the Dordogne department
  - Château de Biron, in the village of Biron, Dordogne
- Biron, Pyrénées-Atlantiques, in the Pyrénées-Atlantiques department

=== United States ===
- Biron, Wisconsin

== People ==
- Biron (surname), includes a list of people with the surname
- Biron House (1884–1930), English cricketer

== Other uses ==
- Biron, original name of the centaur who later became Comet (DC Comics)
- Biron (or Berowne), a light-headed, light-tongued lord in the suite of the King of Navarre, in Shakespeare's Love's Labour's Lost
- Biron, a character in the tragedy The Fatal Marriage, by Thomas Southerne; the husband of Isabella, and brother of Carlos

== See also ==
- Byron (disambiguation)
