= John Byrom (cricketer) =

English cricketer

John Lewis Byrom (20 July 1851 – 24 August 1931) was an English first-class cricketer, who played two matches for Yorkshire County Cricket Club in 1874, home and away against Gloucestershire, and for the Gentlemen of the North against the Players of the North at Fartown Ground, Huddersfield, in September 1877. His right arm fast medium bowling was not called upon in the first-class game.

Born in Saddleworth in the West Riding of Yorkshire, England, Byrom died aged 80, in August 1931 in Delph, Saddleworth.
