= Port Byron =

Port Byron is the name of several places in the United States:

- Port Byron, Illinois
- Port Byron Township, Illinois
- Port Byron, New York
