= Byron, Fond du Lac County, Wisconsin =

Byron, Wisconsin
- Town
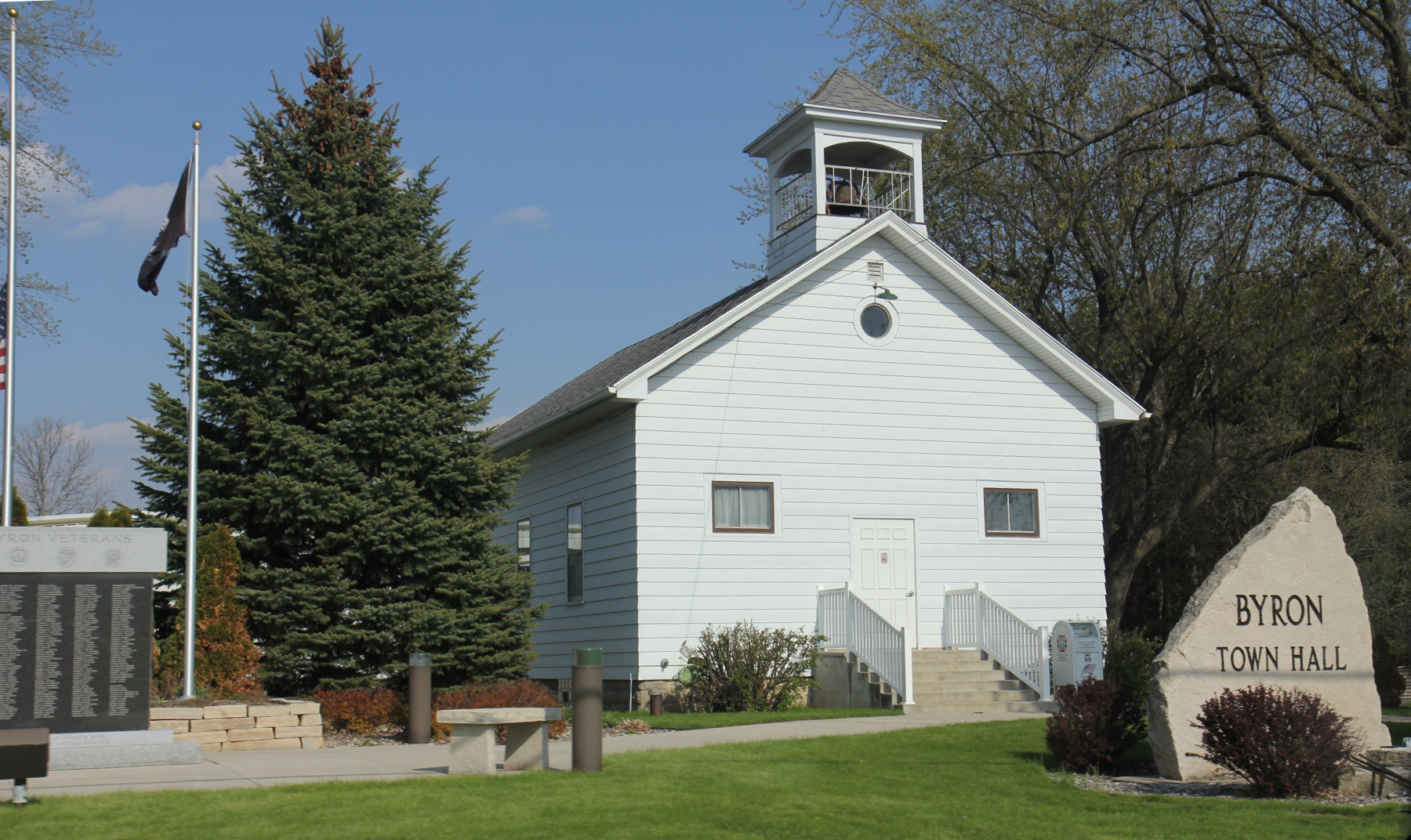
- Town hall

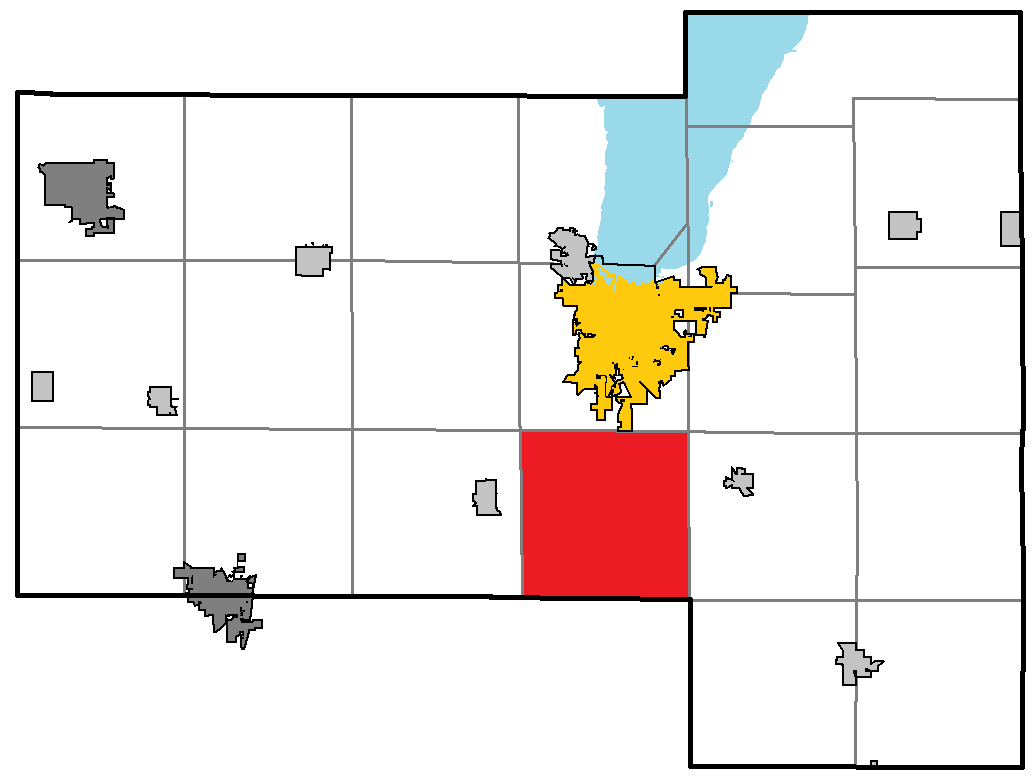
- Location of Byron, within Fond du Lac County
- Coordinates: 43°40′56″N 88°27′16″W
- Country: United States
- State: Wisconsin
- County: Fond du Lac

Area
  - Total: 36.3 sq mi (94.1 km^{2})
  - Land: 36.3 sq mi (94.1 km^{2})
  - Water: 0 sq mi (0.0 km^{2})
- Elevation: 1,040 ft (317 m)

Population (2020)
  - Total: 1,677
  - Density: 46.2/sq mi (17.8/km^{2})
- Time zone: UTC-6 (Central (CST))
  - Summer (DST): UTC-5 (CDT)
- Area code: 920
- FIPS code: 55-11600
- GNIS feature ID: 1582896
- Website: https://townofbyronwi.gov/

Byron is a town in Fond du Lac County, Wisconsin, United States. As of the 2020 census, the town population was 1,677. The unincorporated communities of Byron, Hamilton, and South Byron are located in the town.

== Geography ==
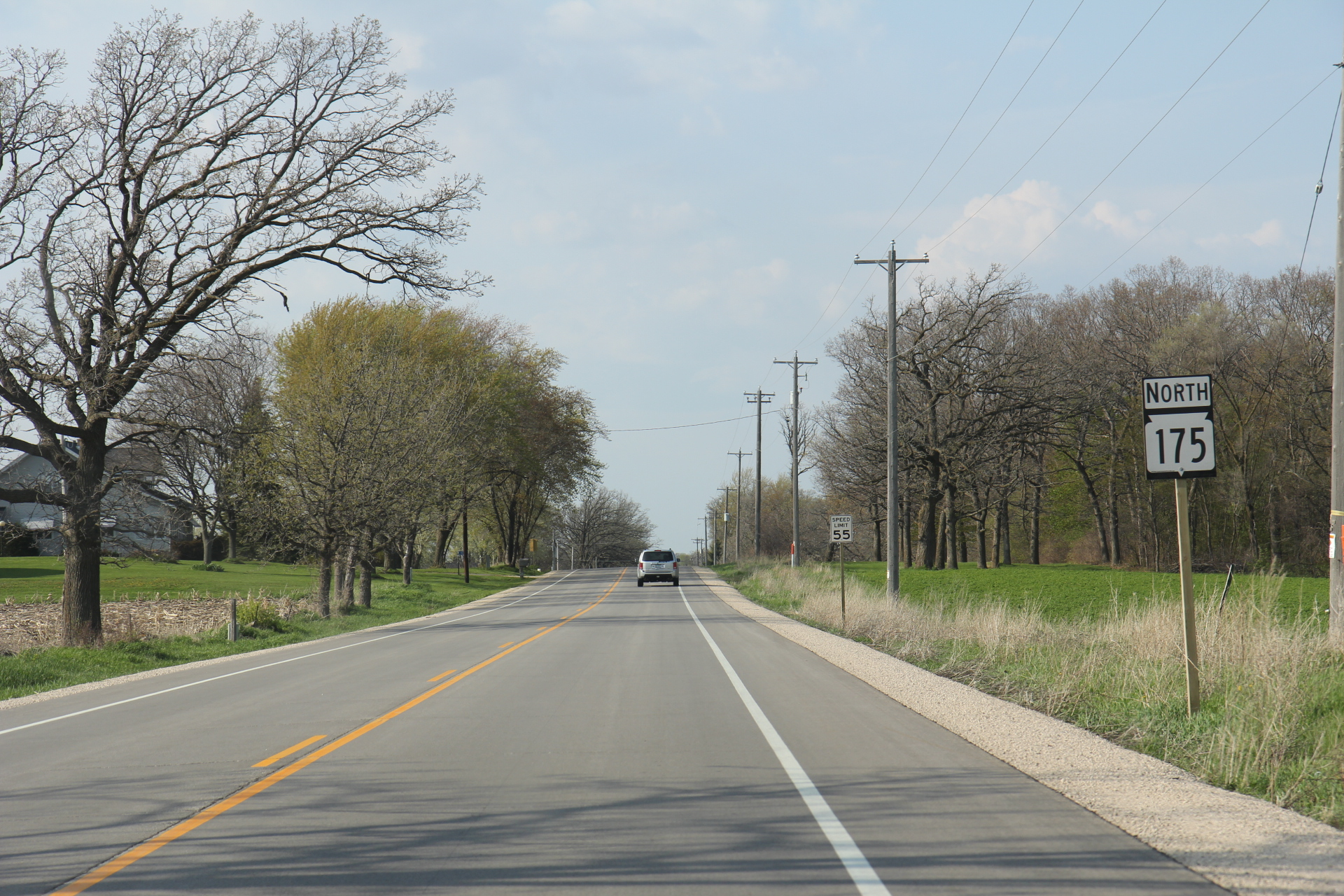
WIS 175 in the town of Byron

According to the United States Census Bureau, the town has a total area of 36.3 square miles (94.1 km^{2}), all land.

== Demographics ==
As of the census of 2000, there were 1,550 people, 538 households, and 448 families residing in the town. The population density was 42.7 people per square mile (16.5/km^{2}). There were 555 housing units at an average density of 15.3 per square mile (5.9/km^{2}). The racial makeup of the town was 98.65% White, 0.13% African American, 0.26% Native American, 0.13% Asian, 0.65% from other races, and 0.19% from two or more races. Hispanic or Latino of any race were 2.19% of the population.

There were 538 households, out of which 36.6% had children under the age of 18 living with them, 72.9% were married couples living together, 5.6% had a female householder with no husband present, and 16.7% were non-families. 13.0% of all households were made up of individuals, and 5.4% had someone living alone who was 65 years of age or older. The average household size was 2.88 and the average family size was 3.17.

In the town, the population was spread out, with 27.3% under the age of 18, 8.3% from 18 to 24, 25.9% from 25 to 44, 28.5% from 45 to 64, and 10.1% who were 65 years of age or older. The median age was 38 years. For every 100 females, there were 102.9 males. For every 100 females age 18 and over, there were 107.9 males.

The median income for a household in the town was $56,667, and the median income for a family was $59,479. Males had a median income of $38,826 versus $23,125 for females. The per capita income for the town was $22,593. About 2.9% of families and 4.9% of the population were below the poverty line, including 9.0% of those under age 18 and 5.3% of those age 65 or over.

== Railroads ==
Byron Hill is a railroad feature between the town of Byron and the city of Fond du Lac.

== Notable people ==
- Oscar Brookin, Spanish–American War Medal of Honor recipient
- Wolcott Turner Brooks, politician, lived in the town
- Byrde M. Vaughan, politician, was born in the town
- Steve Wittman, aviator, was born in the town
