= Byron (community), Fond du Lac County, Wisconsin =

Byron, Wisconsin
- Unincorporated community
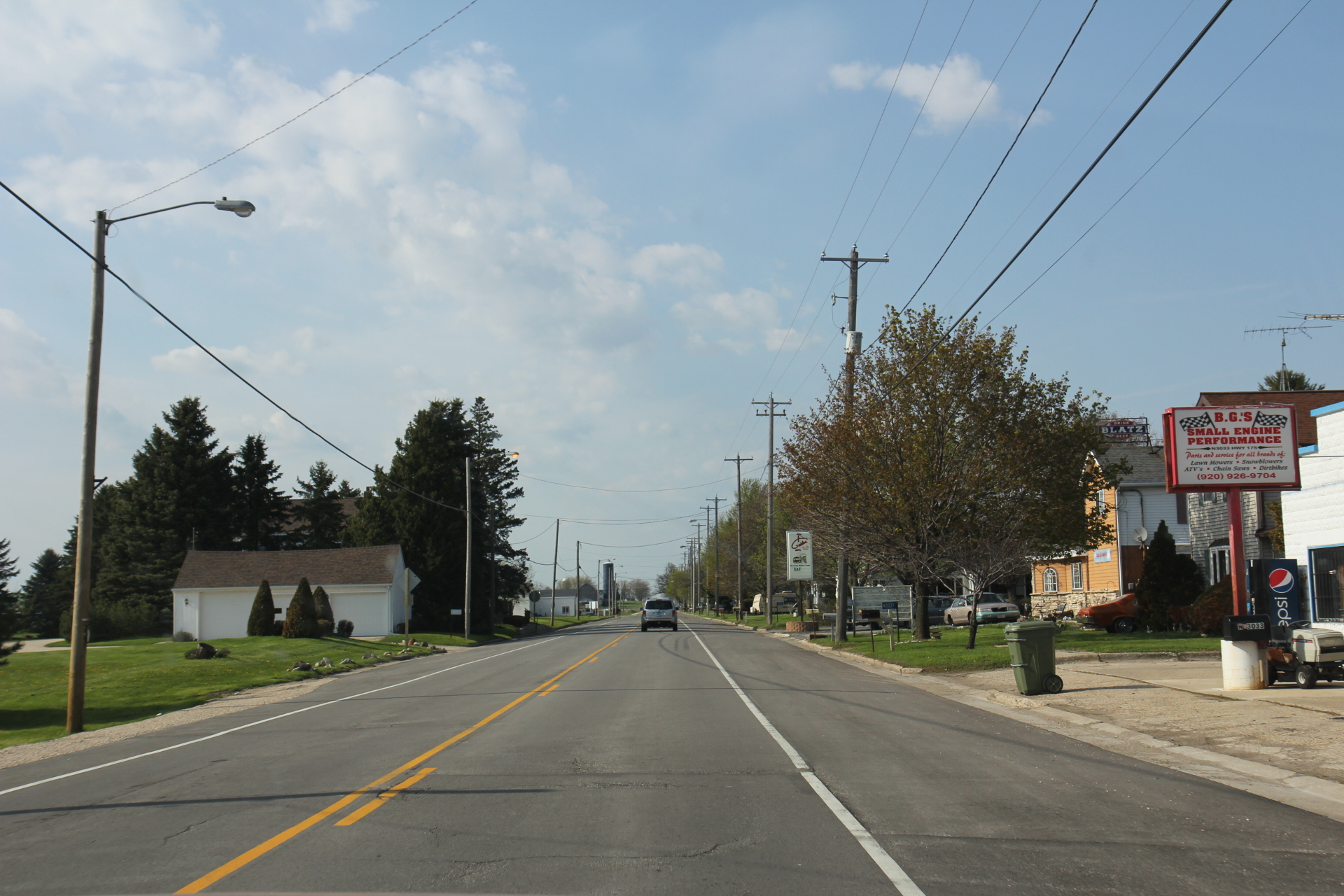
- Looking north at downtown Byron

- Location within Wisconsin Location within the United States
- Coordinates: 43°39′08″N 88°27′03″W
- Country: United States
- State: Wisconsin
- County: Fond du Lac
- Elevation: 1,063 ft (324 m)
- Time zone: UTC-6 (Central (CST))
  - Summer (DST): UTC-5 (CDT)
- Zip: 53009
- Area code: 920
- GNIS feature ID: 1562496

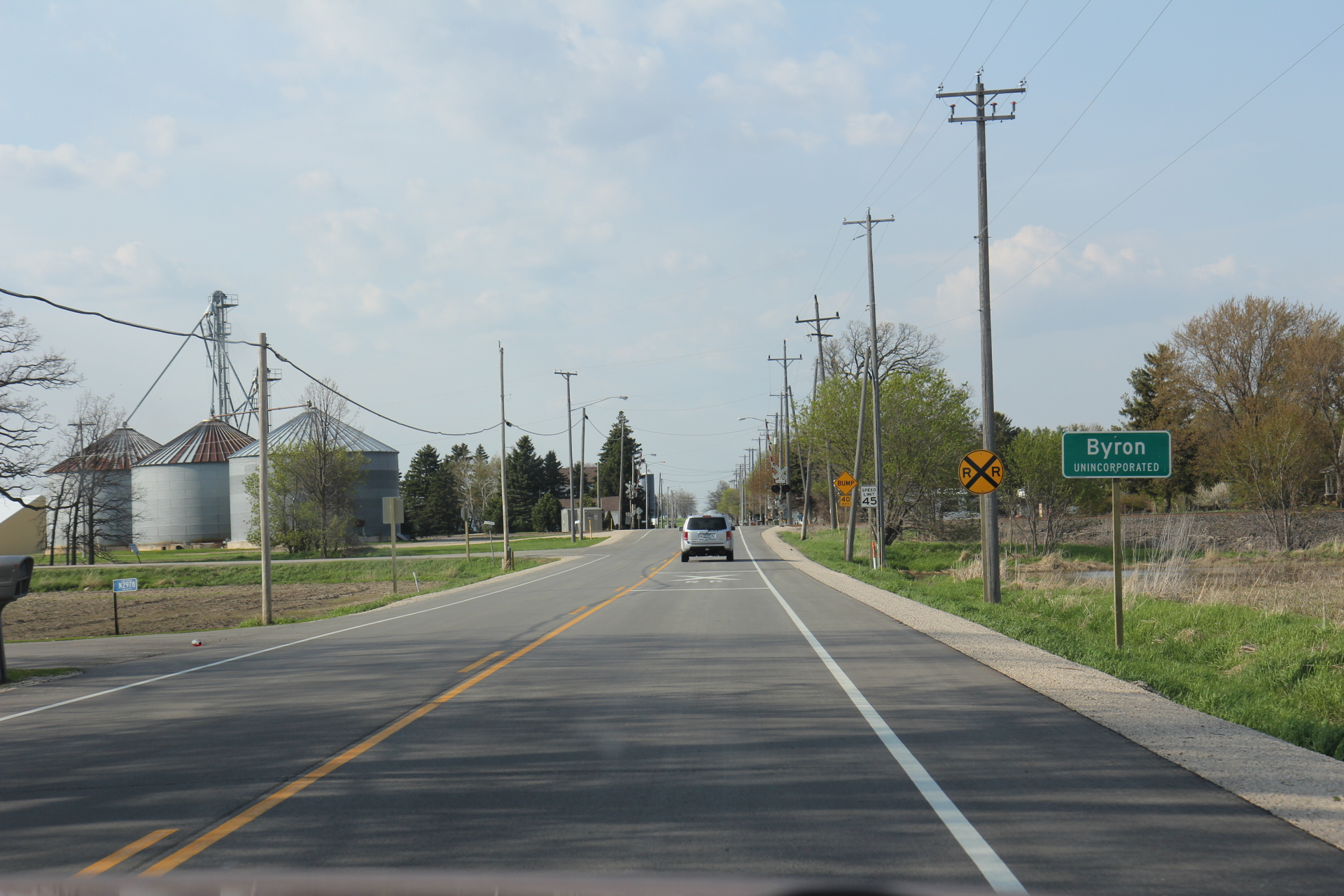
Looking north at the sign for Byron on WIS 175

Byron is an unincorporated community located in the town of Byron, in Fond du Lac County, Wisconsin, United States. Byron is 3 miles (4.8 km) northeast of Brownsville on Wisconsin Highway 175.
