= Byron Hill (railroad location) =

Railroad feature in Eastern Wisconsin

Coordinates: 43°39′19″N 88°27′16″W

Byron Hill is a railroad feature in eastern Wisconsin between the town of Byron and the city of Fond du Lac. The hill is on the Canadian National Railway's Waukesha Subdivision, which used to be operated by the Soo Line Railroad. The Wisconsin Central Railroad first operated over this hill until 1961 when it was merged into the Soo. In 1987, the Soo launched the Lake States Transportation Division to sell off its least profitable lines. That same year, Wisconsin Central Ltd. was created. It operated for 14 years until 2001 when CN absorbed the WC. It features as many as 25 trains per day. Byron Hill is noteworthy in that helper engines are sometimes still used to assist trains making it over the grade.
