= Byron Township, Waseca County, Minnesota =

Byron Township, Minnesota
- Township
- Location within the state of Minnesota Byron Township, Minnesota (the United States)
- Coordinates: 43°52′21″N 93°35′51″W
- Country: United States
- State: Minnesota
- County: Waseca

Area
  - Total: 36.1 sq mi (93.5 km^{2})
  - Land: 35.9 sq mi (93.1 km^{2})
  - Water: 0.15 sq mi (0.4 km^{2})
- Elevation: 1,171 ft (357 m)

Population (2000)
  - Total: 248
  - Density: 7.0/sq mi (2.7/km^{2})
- Time zone: UTC-6 (Central (CST))
  - Summer (DST): UTC-5 (CDT)
- FIPS code: 27-09172
- GNIS feature ID: 0663722

Byron Township is a township in Waseca County, Minnesota, United States. The population was 216 at the 2020 census.

Byron Township was organized in 1858. At the meeting of the board of supervisors, Nov. 1st, 1858, township number 105, range 23, was at this meeting organizes and named Byron, one of the first settlers of Vivian, the town was named in honor of Byron Philbrook, then living in California. Who was the brother of resident Roscoe Philbrook.

== Geography ==
According to the United States Census Bureau, the township has a total area of 36.1 square miles (93 km^{2}), of which 36.0 square miles (93 km^{2}) is land and 0.2 square miles (0.52 km^{2}) (0.44%) is water.

== Demographics ==
As of the census of 2000, there were 248 people, 99 households, and 75 families residing in the township. The population density was 6.9 inhabitants per square mile (2.7/km^{2}). There were 105 housing units at an average density of 2.9 per square mile (1.1/km^{2}). The racial makeup of the township was 99.19% White, and 0.81% from two or more races.

There were 99 households, out of which 33.3% had children under the age of 18 living with them, 69.7% were married couples living together, 2.0% had a female householder with no husband present, and 24.2% were non-families. 19.2% of all households were made up of individuals, and 8.1% had someone living alone who was 65 years of age or older. The average household size was 2.51 and the average family size was 2.88.

In the township the population was spread out, with 25.8% under the age of 18, 6.0% from 18 to 24, 26.2% from 25 to 44, 20.2% from 45 to 64, and 21.8% who were 65 years of age or older. The median age was 40 years. For every 100 females, there were 105.0 males. For every 100 females age 18 and over, there were 114.0 males.

The median income for a household in the township was $42,188, and the median income for a family was $44,286. Males had a median income of $32,292 versus $20,625 for females. The per capita income for the township was $18,577. About 6.3% of families and 7.0% of the population were below the poverty line, including 7.1% of those under the age of eighteen and 10.4% of those 65 or over.
