= Byram, North Yorkshire =

Village in North Yorkshire, England

Coordinates: 53°43′27″N 1°15′38″W

Byram
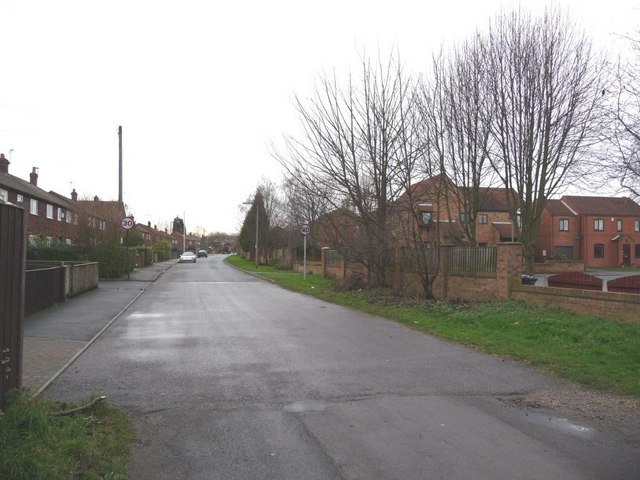
- Houses along Byram Park Road

- Location within North Yorkshire
- OS grid reference: SE486256
- Civil parish: Byram cum Sutton
- Unitary authority: North Yorkshire
- Ceremonial county: North Yorkshire
- Region: Yorkshire and the Humber
- Country: England
- Sovereign state: United Kingdom
- Post town: KNOTTINGLEY
- Postcode district: WF11
- Dialling code: 01977
- Police: North Yorkshire
- Fire: North Yorkshire
- Ambulance: Yorkshire
- UK Parliament: Selby

Byram is a village in the county of North Yorkshire, England. It lies 3 miles (4.8 km) east of Castleford, across the River Aire in West Yorkshire. Byram is the principal settlement in the civil parish of Byram cum Sutton.

The toponym is from the Old English bȳrum, the dative plural of bȳre, so means "at the byres or cowsheds". Byram was historically a hamlet, part of the township of Byram cum Poole in the ancient parish of Brotherton in the West Riding of Yorkshire. Byram cum Poole became a separate civil parish in 1866, but in 1891 was merged with the civil parish of Sutton to form the civil parish of Byram cum Sutton. Byram grew rapidly in the 1950s and 1960s. In 1974 it was transferred to the new county of North Yorkshire. From 1974 to 2023 it was part of the Selby District, it is now administered by the unitary North Yorkshire Council.

Byram Hall was a large country house east of the village, in Byram Park. The estate was owned by the Ramsden family from 1628 to 1922. The house was demolished in the 1950s, but a number of buildings remain in the park. The 18th century lodge is a Grade II listed building. The 18th century orangery has been converted into a house.

== See also ==
- Listed buildings in Byram cum Sutton
