= Biram =

Biram may refer to:

== People ==
- Arthur Biram, Israeli philosopher and educator
- Scott H. Biram, American musician
- Biram Dah Abeid, Mauritanian politician and anti-slavery advocate

== Places ==
- Hadejia, previously Biram, a town in Northern Nigeria
- Kafr Bir'im, a village in the British Mandate of Palestine
