= List of bridges on the National Register of Historic Places in Minnesota =

This is a list of bridges on the National Register of Historic Places in the U.S. state of Minnesota.

Name	Image	Built	Listed	Location	County	Type
Aerial Lift Bridge		1901, 1905, 1929	1973-05-22	Duluth; 46°46′45″N 92°5′34″W	St. Louis	Vertical lift
Anoka–Champlin Mississippi River Bridge		1929	1979-12-31	Anoka, Champlin; 45°11′25″N 93°23′45″W	Anoka, Hennepin	Concrete arch
Bridge No. 12		1908	1989-11-06	Red Wing; 44°32′31″N 92°26′19″W	Goodhue	Warren pony truss
Bridge No. 1482		1908	1992-06-25	Luverne; 43°37′45″N 96°12′36″W	Rock	Pony truss
Bridge No. 3355-Kathio Township	Bridge #3355 on U.S. Route 169	1939	1998-06-29	Kathio Township; 46°12′56″N 93°47′33″W	Mille Lacs	Concrete slab
Bridge No. 3589-Silver Creek Township	Bridge No. 3589	1924, 1939	1998-06-29	Silver Creek Township; 47°2′59″N 91°37′50″W	Lake	Concrete arch
Bridge No. 4846	Bridge No. 4846	1875, 1929	1981-02-17	Kasota; 44°15′59″N 93°53′54″W	Le Sueur	Pratt through truss
Bridge No. 4969	Bridge No. 4969	1930	2015-01-21	Camp Ripley; 44°4′28″N 94°20′6″W	Morrison	Steel plate girder
Bridge No. 5083-Marshall	Bridge No. 5083	1931	1998-06-29	Marshall; 44°26′58″N 95°47′6″W	Lyon	Concrete girder
Bridge No. 5151-Marshall	Bridge No. 5151	1931	1998-06-29	Marshall; 44°26′35″N 95°47′58″W	Lyon	Concrete girder
Bridge No. 5265-Garrison		1938	1998-06-29	Garrison; 46°17′19″N 93°49′29″W	Crow Wing	Multi-plate arch
Bridge No. 5388		1935	1998-06-26	Le Roy Township; 43°31′56″N 92°31′7″W	Mower	Warren polygonal pony truss
Bridge No. 5721	Bridge No. 5721	1877, 1937	1998-07-13	Stillwater Township; 45°6′16″N 92°51′54″W	Washington	Camelback through truss
Bridge No. 5722	Bridge No. 5722	1936	2011-07-20	Spring Valley; 43°41′17″N 92°23′21″W	Fillmore	Box culvert
Bridge No. 5757	Bridge 5757	1937	1998-06-26	Duluth; 46°39′38″N 92°16′32″W	St. Louis	Multi-plate arch. Removed in 2019.
Bridge No. 5827-Zumbro Falls		1938	1998-06-29	Zumbro Falls; 44°16′59″N 92°25′6″W	Wabasha	Multi-plate arch
Bridge No. 6679		1949	2011-07-20	Houston; 43°44′19″N 91°33′52″W	Houston	Steel cantilever
Bridge No. 8096		1947	1998-06-26	Northfield; 44°27′51″N 93°9′13″W	Rice	Concrete arch
Bridge No. 90646		1937	2016-02-02	Edina; 44°54′42″N 93°20′2″W	Hennepin	Multi-plate arch
Bridge No. 90980		1899	1997-01-09	Forest City; 45°12′8″N 94°22′44″W	Meeker	Pratt through truss
Bridge No. L-2162		ca. 1907	1989-11-06	Jasper; 43°46′46″N 96°25′54″W	Rock	Concrete arch
Bridge No. L-2315		ca. 1901	1989-11-06	Luverne; 43°33′21″N 96°9′9″W	Rock	Concrete arch
Bridge No. L-2316		ca. 1906	1989-11-06	Luverne; 43°33′31″N 96°9′9″W	Rock	Concrete arch
Bridge No. L4013		1915	1990-07-05	Spring Grove; 43°37′21″N 91°42′20″W	Houston	Stone arch. Removed in 2016.
Bridge No. L-4646		1911	1989-11-06	Beaver Creek; 43°36′55″N 96°21′34″W	Rock	Concrete arch
Bridge No. L4770		ca. 1915	1989-11-06	Fountain; 43°44′24″N 92°5′39″W	Fillmore	Stone arch
Bridge No. L-5573		1894	1997-01-25	Clinton Falls Township; 44°8′2″N 93°14′38″W	Steele	Pratt through truss
Bridge No. L6007		ca. 1925	1989-11-06	Duluth; 46°42′13″N 92°13′41″W	St. Louis	Stone arch
Bridge No. L6113		1925	2016-12-20	Duluth; 46°49′10″N 92°03′48″W	St. Louis	Concrete arch
Bridge No. L7075		1940	2016-04-12	Hartford Township; 46°2′56.7″N 94°48′46.4″W	Todd	Multi-plate arch
Bridges No. L-5853 and 92247		1904	1989-11-06	Saint Paul; 44°58′42″N 93°8′47″W	Ramsey	Concrete arch
Bridge No. L8515		1922	2016-12-20	Duluth; 46°49′46″N 92°04′21″W	St. Louis	Concrete arch
Broadway Bridge	Broadway Bridge	1931	1999-08-05	Oshawa Township, Saint Peter; 44°19′29″N 93°57′10″W	Le Sueur, Nicollet	Pennsylvania through truss
Cappelen Memorial Bridge		1919, 1923	1978-11-28	Minneapolis; 44°57′46″N 93°13′28″W	Hennepin	Parabolic-arch bridge
Cedar Avenue Bridge		1929	1989-11-06	Minneapolis; 44°58′52″N 93°14′32″W	Hennepin	Concrete arch
Chicago, Milwaukee and St. Paul Railroad Grade Separation		1912–1916	2005-06-01	Minneapolis; 44°57′1″N 93°16′18″W	Hennepin	Concrete girder
Colorado Street Bridge		1888	1990-07-05	Saint Paul; 44°56′5″N 93°5′3″W	Ramsey	Masonry arch
Dodd Ford Bridge	Dood Ford Bridge	1901	2009-12-09	Shelby; 43°52′34.81″N 94°11′16.34″W	Blue Earth	Pratt through truss
Faribault Viaduct		1937	1989-11-06	Faribault; 44°17′27″N 93°16′0″W	Rice	Concrete bridge
Fort Snelling-Mendota Bridge		1925–1926	1978-12-01	Mendota, Minneapolis; 44°53′6″N 93°10′25″W	Dakota, Hennepin	Concrete arch
Frank's Ford Bridge		1895	1980-07-08	Oronoco; 44°7′47″N 92°27′45″W	Olmsted	Pratt through truss
Great Northern Railway Company Bridge		1915	1980-10-14	Cass Lake; 47°16′8″N 94°37′39″W	Cass	Plate girder
Hanover Bridge		1885	1979-12-11	Hanover, Rogers; 45°9′13″N 93°39′41″W	Hennepin, Wright	Pratt through truss
Holmes Street Bridge		1927	2010-07-10	Shakopee; 44°48′1″N 93°31′38″W	Scott	Deck Warren truss
Intercity Bridge		1927	1989-11-06	Minneapolis, Saint Paul; 44°55′4″N 93°12′14″W	Hennepin, Ramsey	Concrete arch
Interlachen Bridge		1900	1989-11-06	Minneapolis; 44°55′53″N 93°18′31″W	Hennepin	Concrete arch
Kern Bridge		1873	1980-07-28	Skyline; 44°6′35″N 94°2′31″W	Blue Earth	Bowstring through truss
Kettle River Bridge		1948	1998-06-29	Sandstone; 46°7′44″N 92°51′23″W	Pine	Deck Pratt truss
Lester River Bridge-Bridge No. 5772	Lester River Bridge	1925	2002-09-06	Duluth; 46°50′12″N 92°0′22″W	St. Louis	Concrete arch
Long Meadow Bridge	Long Meadow Bridge	1920	2013-05-28	Bloomington; 44°49′48″N 93°14′31″W	Hennepin	Camelback through truss
Marsh Concrete Rainbow Arch Bridge	Marsh Concrete Rainbow Arch Bridge	1911	1980-07-28	Courtland; 44°14′13″N 94°21′39″W	Blue Earth	Concrete through arch
Mendota Road Bridge		1894	1989-11-06	Saint Paul; 44°55′31″N 93°6′41″W	Ramsey	Stone arch
Minnesota and International Railway Trestle at Blackduck		1901–1902	2014-02-05	Blackduck; 47°43′34″N 94°32′52″W	Beltrami	Timber trestle
Nymore Bridge		1917	1989-11-06	Bemidji; 47°28′1″N 94°52′42″W	Beltrami	Concrete arch
Point Douglas–St. Louis River Road Bridge	Point Douglas-St. Louis River Road Bridge	1863	1975-02-24	Stillwater; 45°4′32″N 92°49′44″W	Washington	Stone arch
Queen Avenue Bridge		1905	1989-11-06	Minneapolis; 44°55′28″N 93°18′40″W	Hennepin	Concrete arch
Ramsey Park Swayback Bridge		1938	1980-08-11	Redwood Falls; 44°33′2″N 95°7′28″W	Redwood	Swayback
Robert Street Bridge		1926	1989-11-06	Saint Paul; 44°56′31″N 93°5′7″W	Ramsey	Concrete arch
St. Alban's Bay Culvert at Mille Lacs Lake		1938–39	2015-11-16	Garrison Township; 46°16′28.5″N 93°49′19″W	Crow Wing	Box culvert
Seventh Street Improvement Arches		1884	1989-11-06	Saint Paul; 44°57′24″N 93°4′37″W	Ramsey	Stone arch
Soo Line High Bridge		1910–1911	1977-08-22	Stillwater; 45°7′23″N 92°44′39″W	Washington	Steel deck arch
Split Rock Bridge		1938	1989-11-06	Ihlen; 43°53′33″N 96°22′0″W	Pipestone	Stone arch
Stillwater Bridge		1931	1989-05-25	Stillwater; 45°3′27″N 92°48′0″W	Washington	Vertical lift
Third Street Bridge		1909	1989-11-06	Cannon Falls; 44°30′49″N 92°54′14″W	Goodhue	Pennsylvania through truss
Walnut Street Bridge		1904	2003-01-15	Mazeppa; 44°16′23″N 92°32′52″W	Wabasha	Pratt through truss
Waterford Bridge		1909	2010-08-26	Waterford Township; 44°29′15″N 93°7′42″W	Dakota	Camelback through truss
West Bridge		1908	2013-12-03	Madelia; 44°2′40″N 94°25′54″W	Watonwan	Warren through truss
Zieglers Ford Bridge		1904	1989-11-06	Good Thunder; 44°1′45″N 93°59′35″W	Blue Earth	Pratt through truss
Zumbro Parkway Bridge		1937	1989-11-06	Zumbro Falls; 44°16′47″N 92°25′19″W	Wabasha	Multi-plate arch
Zumbrota Covered Bridge		1869, 1871	1975-02-20	Zumbrota; 44°17′47″N 92°40′12″W	Goodhue	Town lattice truss
Stone Arch Bridge part of the St. Anthony Falls Historic District		1883	1971-03-11	Minneapolis; 44°58′51″N 93°15′13″W	Hennepin	Stone arch
Third Avenue Bridge part of the St. Anthony Falls Historic District		1914–1918	1971-03-11	Minneapolis; 44°59′0″N 93°15′32″W	Hennepin	
Bridge No. 1811 over Kettle River		1916	1998-08-28 removed 2005-05-17	Rutledge	Pine	Pratt through truss
Bridge No. 6422-Saint Peter		1948	1999-08-05 removed 2003-08-08	St. Peter	Nicollet	Deck girder
Bridge No. L1409		1895	1990-07-05 removed 2016-11-07	Winona	Winona	Stone arch; destroyed in 2007 by flooding
Bridge No. L3040		1878	1989-11-06 removed 2007-09-20	Belle Plaine	Scott	Stone arch
Dump Road Bridge		1904	1989-11-06 removed 2002-07-01	Faribault	Rice	Pratt through truss
Kennedy Bridge		1883	1989-11-06 removed 2008-5-7	Mankato	Blue Earth	Pratt through truss
Selby Avenue Bridge	Selby Avenue Bridge	1890	1989-11-06 removed 1994-01-10	Saint Paul	Ramsey	Pratt through truss
Smith Avenue High Bridge		1889	1981-08-06 removed 1988-03-28	Saint Paul	Ramsey	Warren truss
Wabasha Street Bridge	Former Wabasha Street Bridge	1890, 1900	1989-11-06 removed 1998-06-22	Saint Paul	Ramsey	Cantilever deck truss
Yellow Bank Church Campground Bridge		1893	1989-11-06 removed 1998-06-30	Odessa	Lac qui Parle	Through truss
