= Bridge No. L1409 =

- Coordinates: 44°03′22″N 91°44′52″W

Statistics
- Bridge No. L1409
- Formerly listed on the U.S. National Register of Historic Places
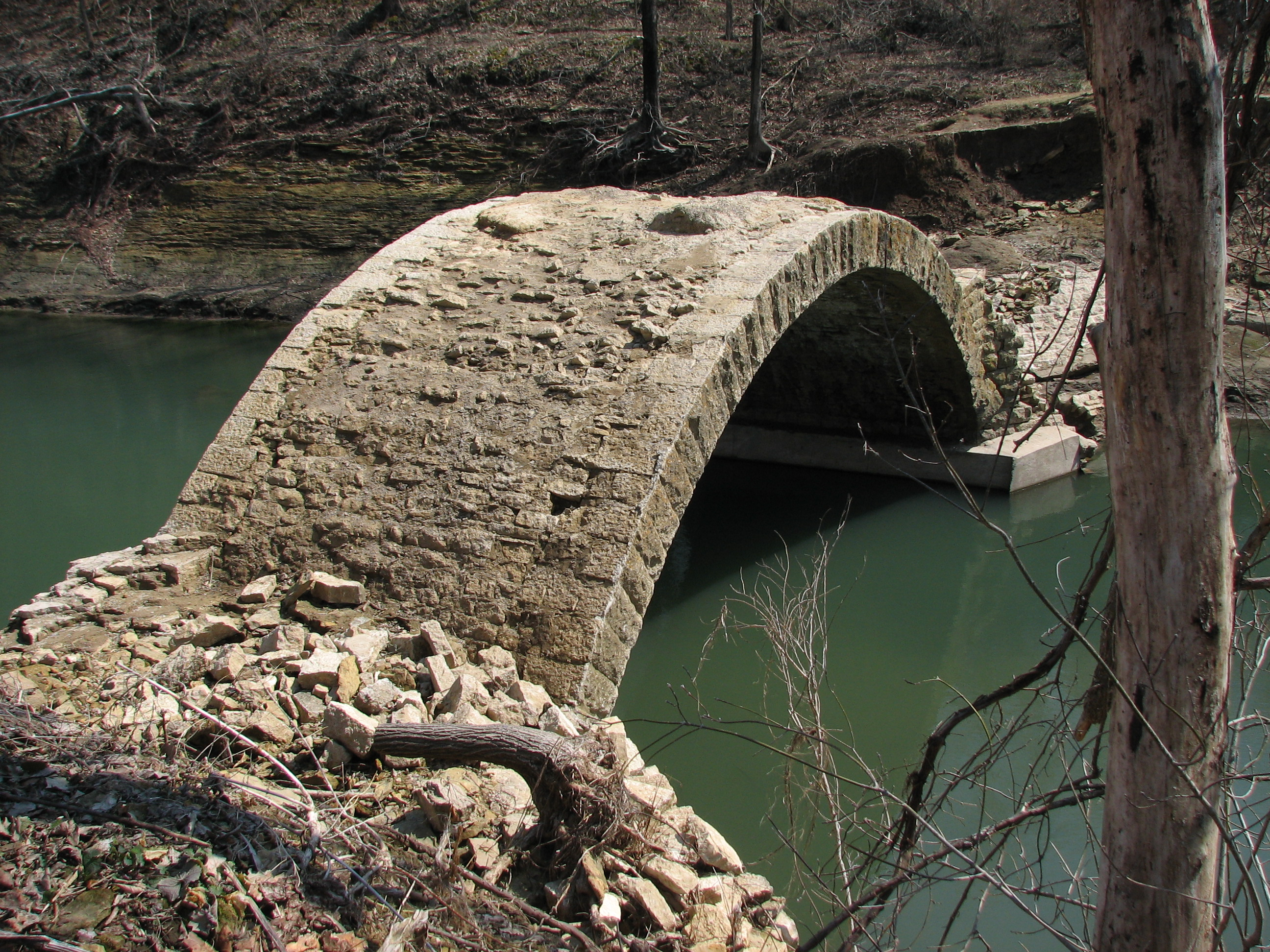
- The stone arch after flooding in 2007 washed away the rest of the bridge

- Location within Minnesota Location within the United States
- Location: Township Road 62 over Garvin Brook, Hillsdale Township, Minnesota
- Nearest city: Stockton, Minnesota
- Coordinates: 44°3′21.5″N 91°44′52″W
- Area: Less than one acre
- Built: 1895
- Built by: Charles Butler
- Architect: Fred H. Pickles
- Architectural style: Stone arch bridge
- Demolished: 2007
- MPS: Minnesota Masonry-Arch Highway Bridges MPS
- NRHP reference No.: 90000978

Significant dates
- Added to NRHP: July 5, 1990
- Removed from NRHP: November 7, 2016

Location
- Interactive map of Bridge No. L1409

Bridge No. L1409, also known as the Garvin Brook Bridge, was a historic stone arch bridge in Hillsdale Township, Minnesota, United States, built in 1895. However it was largely destroyed during the 2007 Midwest flooding, when runoff carried away everything except the arch substructure. It had been listed on the National Register of Historic Places in 1990 for having state-level significance in the theme of engineering. It was nominated for being Minnesota's "most impressive" rural stone arch bridge, owing to its fine ashlar masonry and sizeable 45-foot (14 m) span. The bridge has been replaced by a modern structure. It was officially delisted from the National Register in 2016.

== History ==
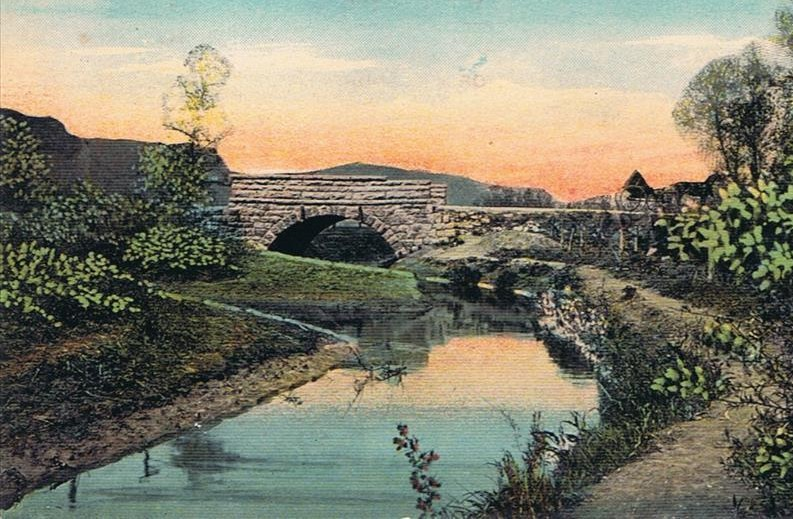
1912 postcard of a similar bridge in Winona

Residents of Hillsdale Township petitioned Winona County for a bridge at this location in September 1894. Initially tabled, the request was later approved and plans were drafted by county surveyor Fred H. Pickles. The project went out for contract in October 1895 and local stonemason Charles Butler—with the lowest bid at $1,340—was selected. The bridge was largely completed by December of that year.

Bridge No. L1409 was among a concentration of rural stone arch bridges in Southeast Minnesota built in the late 19th and early 20th centuries. Most of these were built by local governments in response to the Good Roads Movement. Few, however, spanned more than 15 feet (4.6 m). L1409 was three times that length, and with the fine masonry produced by Butler, it was comparable to the larger and more sophisticated bridges of Minnesota's urban areas.

In the summer of 2007, extreme flooding in Southeast Minnesota sent torrents of water sweeping down Garvin Brook. L1409's spandrel walls and earth fill were torn away, though the stone arch was so sturdily built it held in place. However the bridge was essentially destroyed, and it has since been replaced with a modern structure.

== See also ==
- List of bridges on the National Register of Historic Places in Minnesota
- National Register of Historic Places listings in Winona County, Minnesota
