= Bridge 5827 =

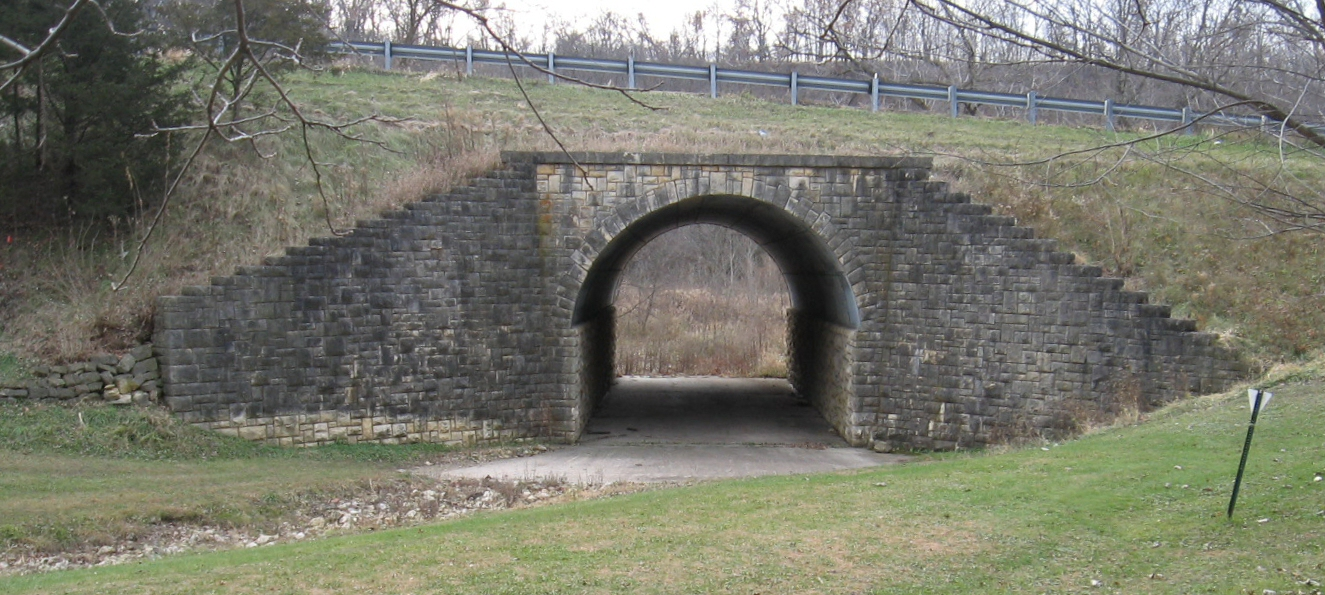
- Bridge 5827 viewed from the north
- Coordinates: 44°16′58″N 92°25′06″W
- Carries: MN 60
- Crosses: Streambed
- Locale: Zumbro Falls, Minnesota
- Maintained by: State of Minnesota
- ID number: WB-ZFC-011

Characteristics
- Design: arch
- Total length: 22.8 feet (6.9 m)
- Width: 74 feet (23 m)

History
- Designer: Minnesota Highway Department
- Constructed by: Works Progress Administration
- Bridge No. 5827–Zumbro Falls
- U.S. National Register of Historic Places
- Location within Minnesota
- Coordinates: 44°16′58.6″N 92°25′7.3″W
- MPS: Iron and Steel Bridges in Minnesota MPS
- NRHP reference No.: 98000684
- Designated: June 29, 1998
- Opened: 1938

Bridge 5827 is a historic arch bridge in Zumbro Falls, Minnesota, United States, built in 1938 by the Works Progress Administration using a modular corrugated iron product called Multi Plate. It was listed on the National Register of Historic Places as the Bridge No. 5827–Zumbro Falls in 1998 for having state-level significance in the theme of engineering. It was nominated as an example of Minnesota's stone-faced Multi Plate bridges with particularly fine masonry.

== History ==
Bridge 5827 is on Minnesota State Highway 60, 0.1 miles east of its intersection with U.S. Route 63. This bridge was built by the Works Progress Administration (WPA) in 1938 for an approximate cost of $2000. This bridge is an example of the labor-intensive New Deal work projects which promoted highway beautification and highlighted local craftsman skills and workmanship. The bridge is built on an Armco Culvert Manufacturers Association galvanized, corrugated-iron structure. Excellent masonry work covers the structure to result in a stoned-faced, multi-plate arch style bridge. Other examples include the nearby Zumbro Parkway Bridge, and Bridge No. 90646 in Minneapolis.

== See also ==
- List of bridges on the National Register of Historic Places in Minnesota
- National Register of Historic Places listings in Wabasha County, Minnesota
