= Bridge L8515 =

Bridge in Duluth, Minnesota

- Bridge No. L8515
- U.S. National Register of Historic Places
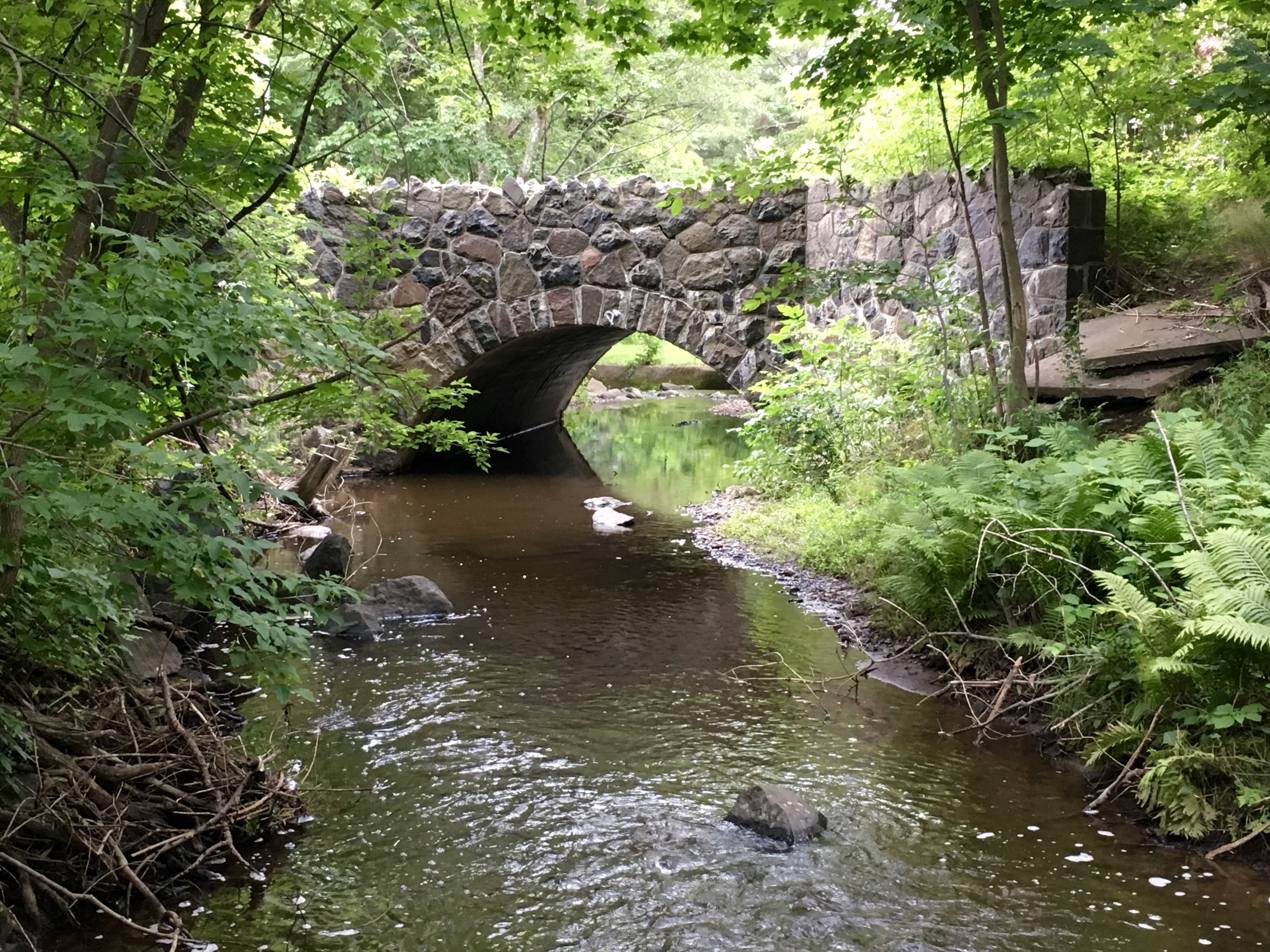
- Bridge L8515 viewed from the north

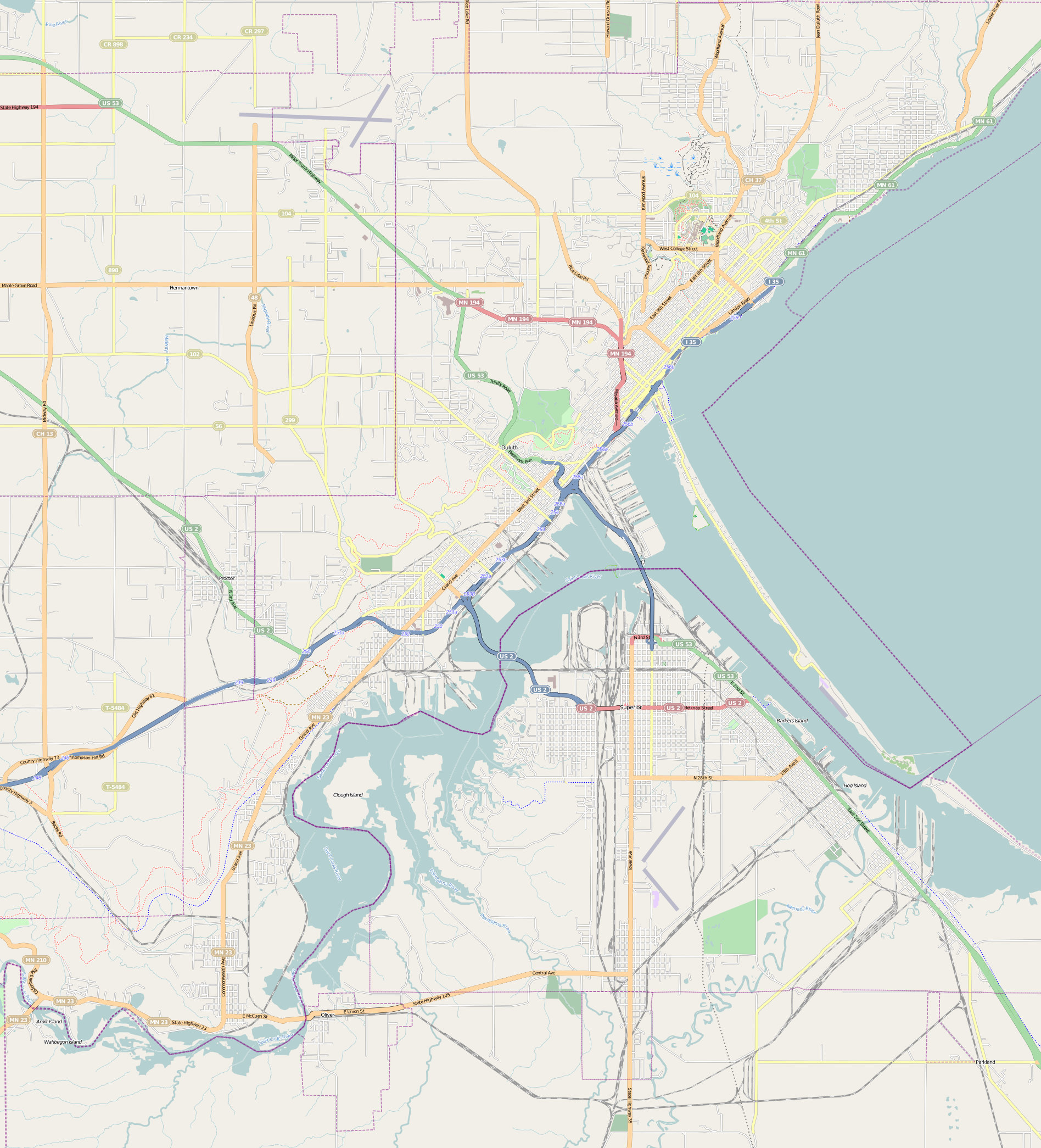
- Location within Duluth Location within Minnesota Location within the United States
- Location: Lewis Street over Tischer Creek, Duluth, Minnesota
- Coordinates: 46°49′45.7″N 92°4′20.7″W
- Area: Less than one acre
- Built: 1922
- Architect: City of Duluth Engineer's Office
- Architectural style: Rustic
- MPS: Reinforced-Concrete Highway Bridges in Minnesota MPS
- NRHP reference No.: 16000873
- Added to NRHP: December 20, 2016

Bridge L8515 is a historic bridge in the Oatmeal Hill neighborhood of Duluth, Minnesota, United States. Built in 1922, it carries Lewis Street over Tischer Creek. Structurally it is a reinforced concrete arch bridge with a veneer of local gabbro masonry. Bridge L8515 was listed on the National Register of Historic Places in 2016 for its local significance in the theme of engineering. It was nominated for being a highly aesthetic example of the rustic bridges built in park-like settings in the first half of the 20th century.

== See also ==
- List of bridges on the National Register of Historic Places in Minnesota
- National Register of Historic Places listings in St. Louis County, Minnesota
