= Bridge L6113 =

Bridge in Duluth, Minnesota

- Bridge No. L6113
- U.S. National Register of Historic Places
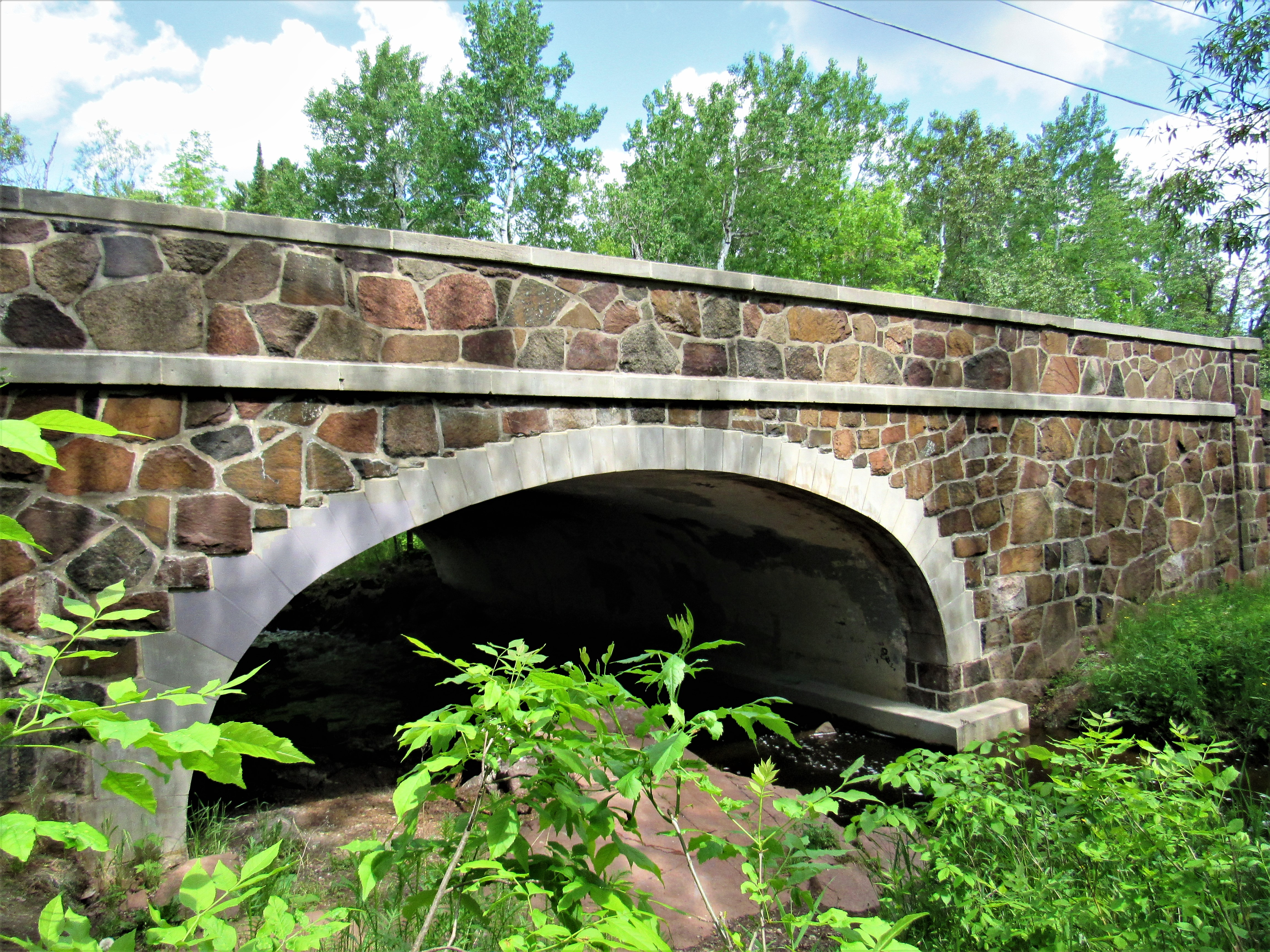
- Bridge L6113 viewed from the south

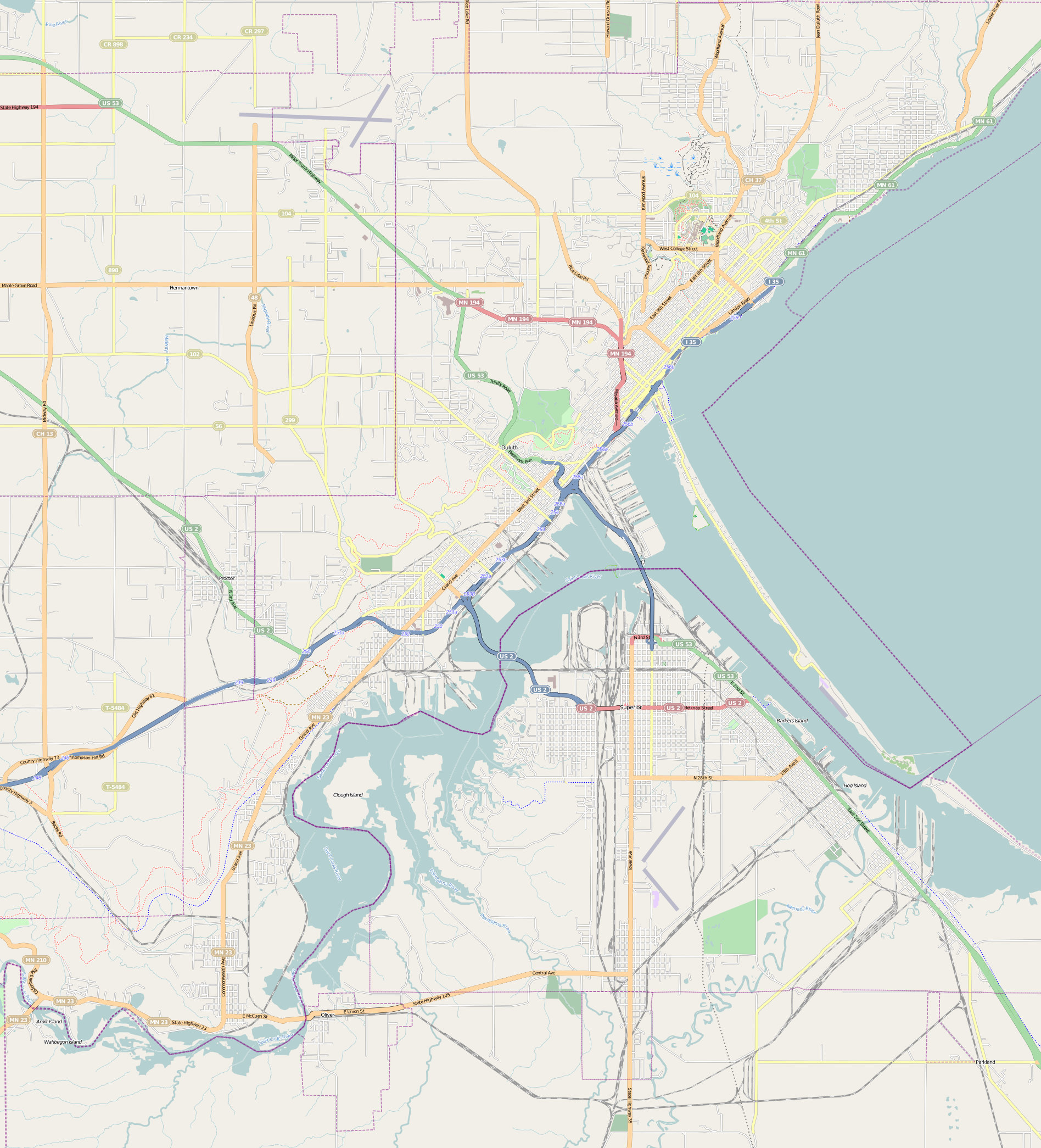
- Location within Duluth Location within Minnesota Location within the United States
- Location: East 4th Street over Tischer Creek in Congdon Park, Duluth, Minnesota
- Coordinates: 46°49′10″N 92°3′47.4″W
- Area: Less than one acre
- Built: 1925
- Built by: Salo & Wiinamaki
- Architect: City of Duluth Engineering Office
- Architectural style: Neoclassical/Rustic
- MPS: Reinforced-Concrete Highway Bridges in Minnesota MPS
- NRHP reference No.: 16000872
- Added to NRHP: December 20, 2016

Bridge L6113 is a historic bridge in Congdon Park in Duluth, Minnesota, United States. Built in 1925, it carries East 4th Street over Tischer Creek. Structurally it is a reinforced concrete arch bridge with a veneer of local gabbro masonry. Artistically it mixes rustic, uncoursed masonry with neoclassical details in its limestone belt courses and arch ring. Bridge L6113 was listed on the National Register of Historic Places in 2016 for its local significance in the theme of engineering. It was nominated for its high aesthetic value of mixed architectural styles complementing its park setting.

== See also ==
- List of bridges on the National Register of Historic Places in Minnesota
- National Register of Historic Places listings in St. Louis County, Minnesota
