= Hillsdale Township =

Hillsdale Township may refer to:

- Hillsdale Township, Michigan
- Hillsdale Township, Winona County, Minnesota
- Hillsdale Township, Eddy County, North Dakota, in Eddy County, North Dakota
- Hillsdale Township, Wells County, North Dakota, in Wells County, North Dakota
- Hillsdale Township, Faulk County, South Dakota, in Faulk County, South Dakota
