= Third Street Bridge =

Third Street Bridge may refer to:

- Lefty O'Doul Bridge (also known as the Third Street Bridge or China Basin Bridge) is a drawbridge which connects the China Basin and Mission Bay neighborhoods of San Francisco, carrying Third Street across the Mission Creek Channel. It is located directly adjacent to AT&T Park.
- Third Street Bridge (Delavan, Illinois), a historic bridge which carries Third Street across a railroad between Pine and Elm Streets in Delavan, Illinois.
- Third Street Bridge (Waverly, Iowa), FHWA No. 012250
- Third Street Bridge (Fairmont), officially known as the David Morgan Memorial Bridge, is a span that crosses the Monongahela River, in Fairmont, West Virginia.
- Third Street Bridge (Cannon Falls, Minnesota), a steel truss bridge across the Cannon River
- Third Street Bridge (Ohio), ID-Nr. 78002192
- Third Street Bridge (Wisconsin), ID-Nr. 88001647
