= Trinity Episcopal Church (Stockton, Minnesota) =

Historic church in Minnesota, United States

- U.S. National Register of Historic Places
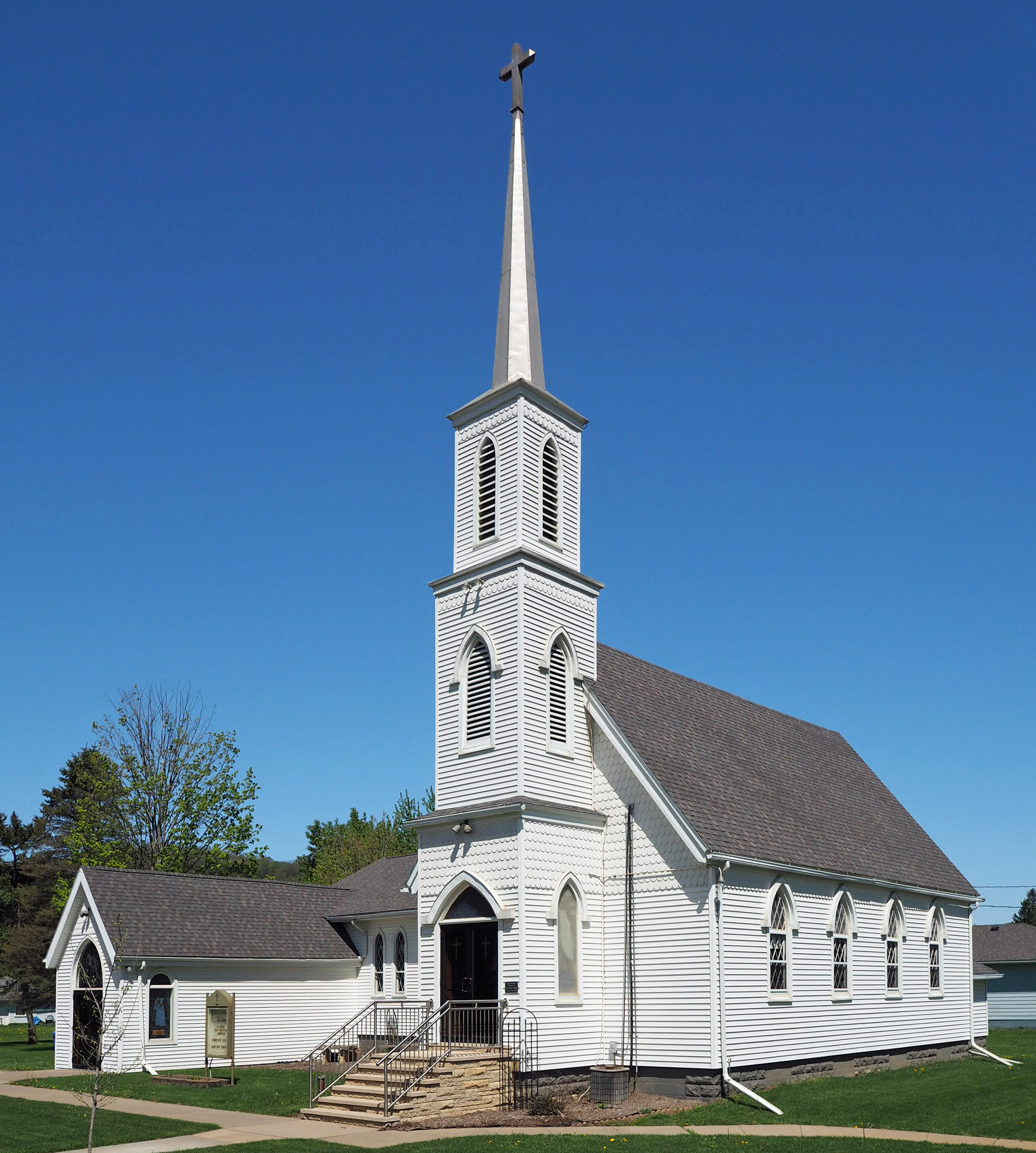
- Trinity Episcopal Church viewed from the southeast

- Location within Minnesota Location within the United States
- Location: 8110 West Main Street, Stockton, Minnesota
- Coordinates: 44°1′39.3″N 91°45′56.3″W
- Area: Less than one acre
- Built: 1859
- Architectural style: Carpenter Gothic
- NRHP reference No.: 84001727
- Added to NRHP: August 9, 1984

Trinity Episcopal Church is a historic church building in Stockton, Minnesota, United States, constructed in 1859. It is now the Grace Evangelical Lutheran Church and was enlarged with a new wing in 1971. The original section was listed on the National Register of Historic Places in 1984 for having local significance in the themes of architecture and exploration/settlement. It was nominated for its well-preserved Carpenter Gothic architecture and shared importance to a community established by American-born settlers but later dominated by German immigrants.

== Description ==
The original wing has been called a "sophisticated example of a Carpenter Gothic church with spire." The building's lancet windows and door are typical of Carpenter Gothic architecture, while its center entry bell tower is atypical.

== History ==
The first settlers arrived in the vicinity of Stockton around 1855. Mostly White Anglo-Saxon Protestants from the East Coast of the United States, they formed an Episcopal parish in 1858 and built the Trinity Episcopal Church the following year. By the end of the 1860s, however, an influx of German immigrants had altered the ethnic composition of Stockton. The church struggled to accommodate a bilingual congregation, and discontinued regular services in 1872. Stockton's new German majority formed a Lutheran congregation in 1891 and obtained the church building the following year.

In 1924 the church was moved a short distance southeast onto a new foundation that had been constructed there with a full basement. At the same time a chancel with stained glass was added. A renovation greatly altered the church's interior in 1956, but did not compromise the historical integrity of the exterior. In 1971 a new wing using a style sympathetic to the original was added to the west.

== See also ==
- List of Anglican churches
- National Register of Historic Places listings in Winona County, Minnesota
