= Shanaska Creek Bridge =

- Bridge No. 4846
- U.S. National Register of Historic Places
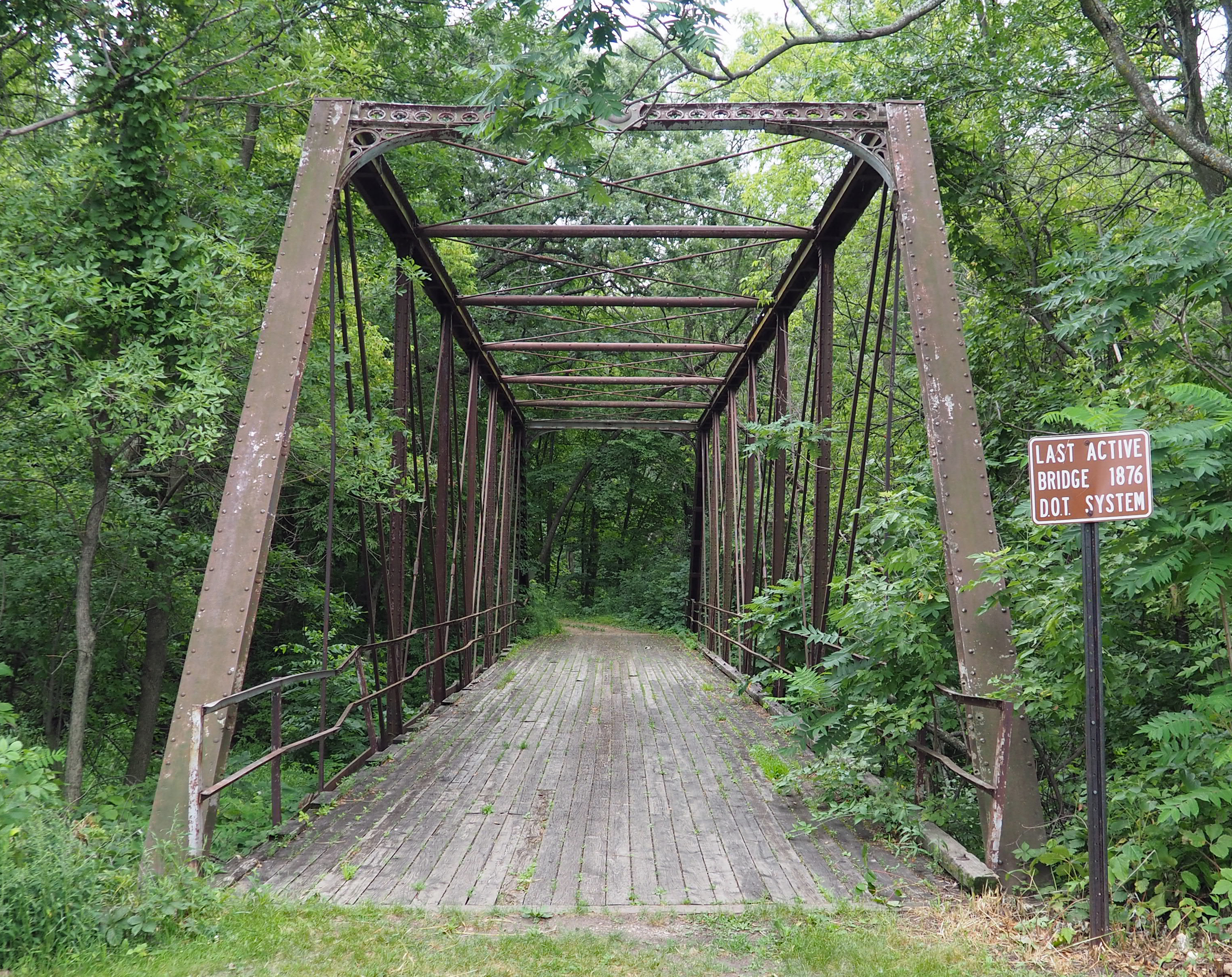
- The bridge in Lake Washington County Park

- Location within Minnesota Location within the United States
- Location: 47102 Washington Park Road, Kasota Township, Minnesota
- Nearest city: Kasota, Minnesota
- Coordinates: 44°15′59″N 93°53′54″W
- Built: 1875
- NRHP reference No.: 81000681
- Designated: February 17, 1981

The Shanaska Creek Bridge, also called Washington Park Bridge and officially Bridge 4846, is an iron 8 panel pin-connected Pratt through truss bridge which was erected in 1875 over the Blue Earth River in the U.S. State of Minnesota and moved twice since. It was built near Vernon Center, Minnesota by Soulerin, James, and Company of Milwaukee, Wisconsin.

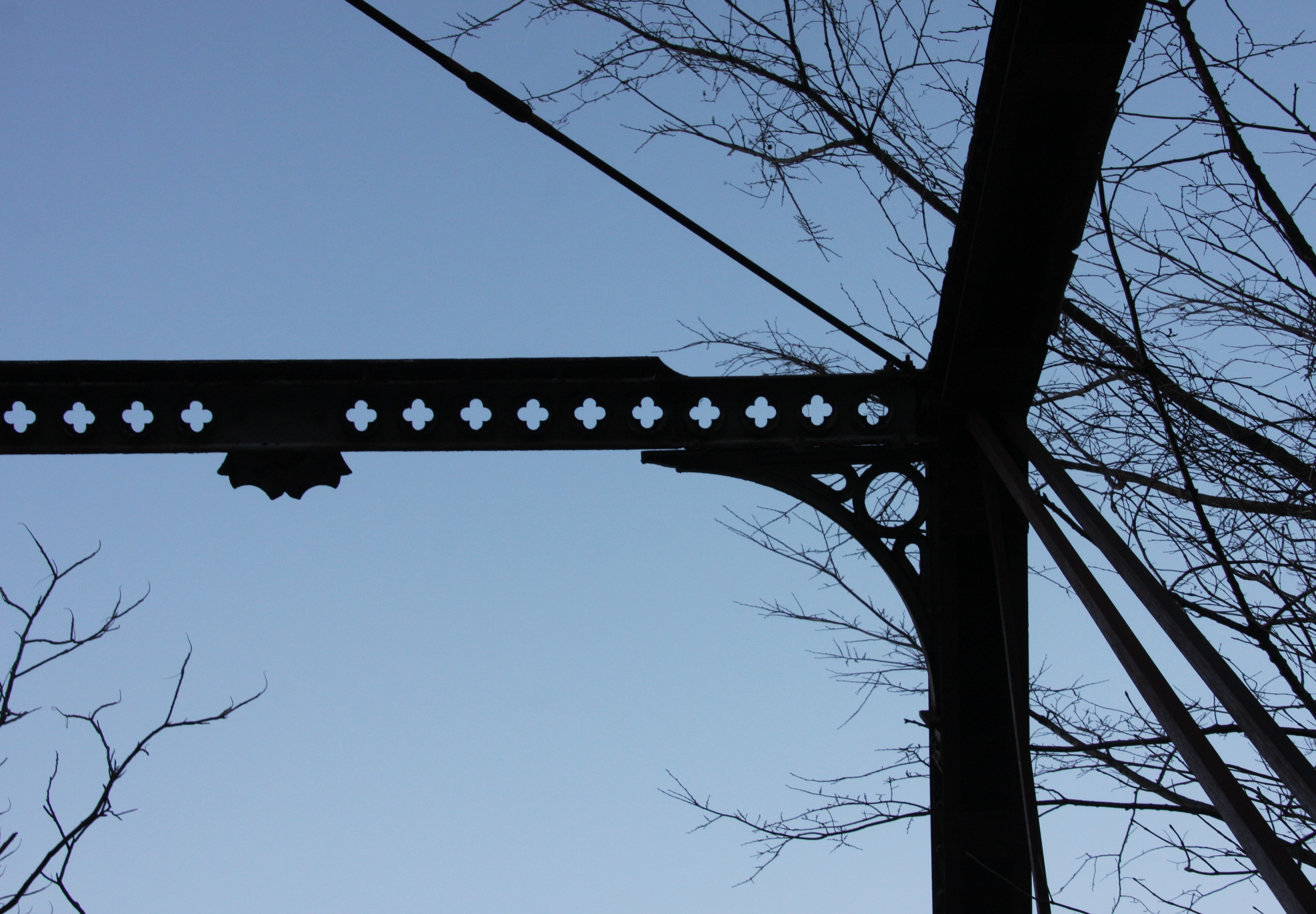
Silhouette of ironwork detail

In 1929, it was placed over Minnesota State Highway 22 to carry Le Sueur County Road 102. It was the oldest bridge of its type left in the state when it was listed at that location on the National Register of Historic Places in 1981.

It was moved again in 1984 to its present location where it carries a hiking and bicycle path over Shanaska Creek in Lake Washington Park near Kasota, Minnesota.

In 2011, Randy Walker covered the bridge in colorful fabric to create a temporary art installation called Passage.

== See also ==
- List of bridges on the National Register of Historic Places in Minnesota
