= Helen Cordelia Putnam =

American public health reformer (1857 – 1951)

- Born: September 14, 1857; Stockton, Minnesota
- Died: February 3, 1951 (aged 93); Providence, Rhode Island
- Education: A.B. (Vassar College, 1878); M.D. (Woman's Medical College of Pennsylvania, 1889)
- Occupations: Physician, suffragist, public health reformer
- Known for: Extensive work in women's and children's health
- Notable work: School Janitors, Mothers, and Health (1913)

Helen Cordelia Putnam (14 September 1857 – 3 February 1951) was an American physician, suffragist, and public health reformer known for her extensive work in women's and children's health. Her career spanned over four decades, during which she made significant contributions to physical education, infant mortality reduction, and the promotion of hygiene in schools.

== Biography ==
=== Early life and education ===
Helen Putnam was born on September 14, 1857, in Stockton, Minnesota, to Herbert Asa Putnam and Celintha T. Gates. Her father ran a general store, while her mother was involved in Sunday-school teaching. The family was part of the early wave of settlers who crossed the Mississippi River in 1855.

Putnam's educational journey began in a traditional one-room school setting. She later pursued higher education, graduating with an A.B. degree from Vassar College in 1878. Seeking to deepen her understanding of physical education, she enrolled in Harvard University's Sargent School of Physical Training, completing her studies in 1883. Upon her return to Vassar, Putnam assumed the position of director of physical education. From 1885 to 1888, she held the position of vice president at the American Association for the Advancement of Physical Education.

=== Medical career ===
==== Education and early work ====
Putnam advanced her studies at the Woman's Medical College of Pennsylvania, focusing on obstetrics and women's health conditions, and attained her M.D. in 1889. Following her medical training, she commenced an internship at the New England Hospital for Women and Children in Boston in 1890. After completing her internship, Putnam relocated to Providence, Rhode Island, where she dedicated the next forty-three years to practicing gynecology.

==== Public health advocacy ====
Putnam was one of the earliest advocates of prenatal care for low-income mothers in America. She promoted prenatal care for expectant mothers, particularly those with limited financial means, by supporting the work of visiting nurses. Recognizing the risks associated with unsanitary milk, she was an early advocate for government inspections of dairies and milk-bottling plants to ensure the safety of milk for infants.

==== International and national Initiatives ====
In 1907, Putnam attended an international conference on school hygiene in London, which inspired her to focus on infant mortality prevention. As president of the American Academy of Medicine in 1908, she initiated a conference on the prevention of infant mortality, leading to the establishment of the American Association for the Study and Prevention of Infant Mortality. This organization worked to improve infant feeding practices, encourage prenatal care, and combat childhood diseases.

Between 1909 and 1912, Putnam wrote a series of articles for Child-Welfare Magazine, aiming to raise parental awareness about the physical environment of schools. These articles were later compiled into her book, School Janitors, Mothers, and Health (1913). She emphasized the importance of physical education and clean, healthful school environments for children's well-being.

Putnam was particularly concerned with the quality of air and cleanliness in schools. She criticized the typical school environment for poor air quality and inadequate cleanliness standards. She advocated for the training of school janitors and urged middle-class mothers to demand better hygiene in schools, similar to their own homes.

In 1923, Putnam and Abraham Jacobi jointly founded the American Child Health Association. The organization's mission was to promote clean school environments, enhance children's healthcare services, and implement comprehensive health and sex education programs that encouraged parental involvement.

Putnam was actively involved in women's welfare, serving on the board of managers of the Rhode Island Women’s Suffrage Association and as secretary of a conference promoting reforms in women’s prisons. She supported therapeutic gardening for the mentally ill and held leadership roles in various health organizations.

Putnam assumed the role of chairperson for the National Education Association's Committee on Racial Well-Being. Additionally, she contributed her expertise to several organizations, including serving on the boards of the American School Hygiene Association, International Union for the Protection of Infants, and Playground Association of America.

=== Later life and legacy ===
In 1935, Putnam retired in Providence. In 1939, she received a significant inheritance, which she largely donated to Providence's Butler Hospital and the Rhode Island School of Design. She also established research fellowships at Western Reserve University in Cleveland, Ohio, and in Radcliffe College, in honor of Marie Zakrzewska. Helen Cordelia Putnam died in Providence on February 3, 1951, at the age of 93.

Putnam's legacy in public health and her contributions to improving children's health and women's welfare are recognized as foundational in the fields of medical and public health reform.

== Sources ==
=== Books ===
- Carey Jr., Charles W. (February 2000). "Putnam, Helen Cordelia". American National Biography. New York: Oxford University Press. doi:10.1093/anb/9780198606697.article.1200752. (subscription required)

=== Journals ===
- Peitzman, Steven J. (1984). "Forgotten Reformers: The American Academy of Medicine". Bulletin of the History of Medicine. 58 (4): 516–528. JSTOR 44441793. PMID 6394084.
