= Bridge 5757 =

Bridge in Duluth, Minnesota

- Bridge No. 5757
- U.S. National Register of Historic Places
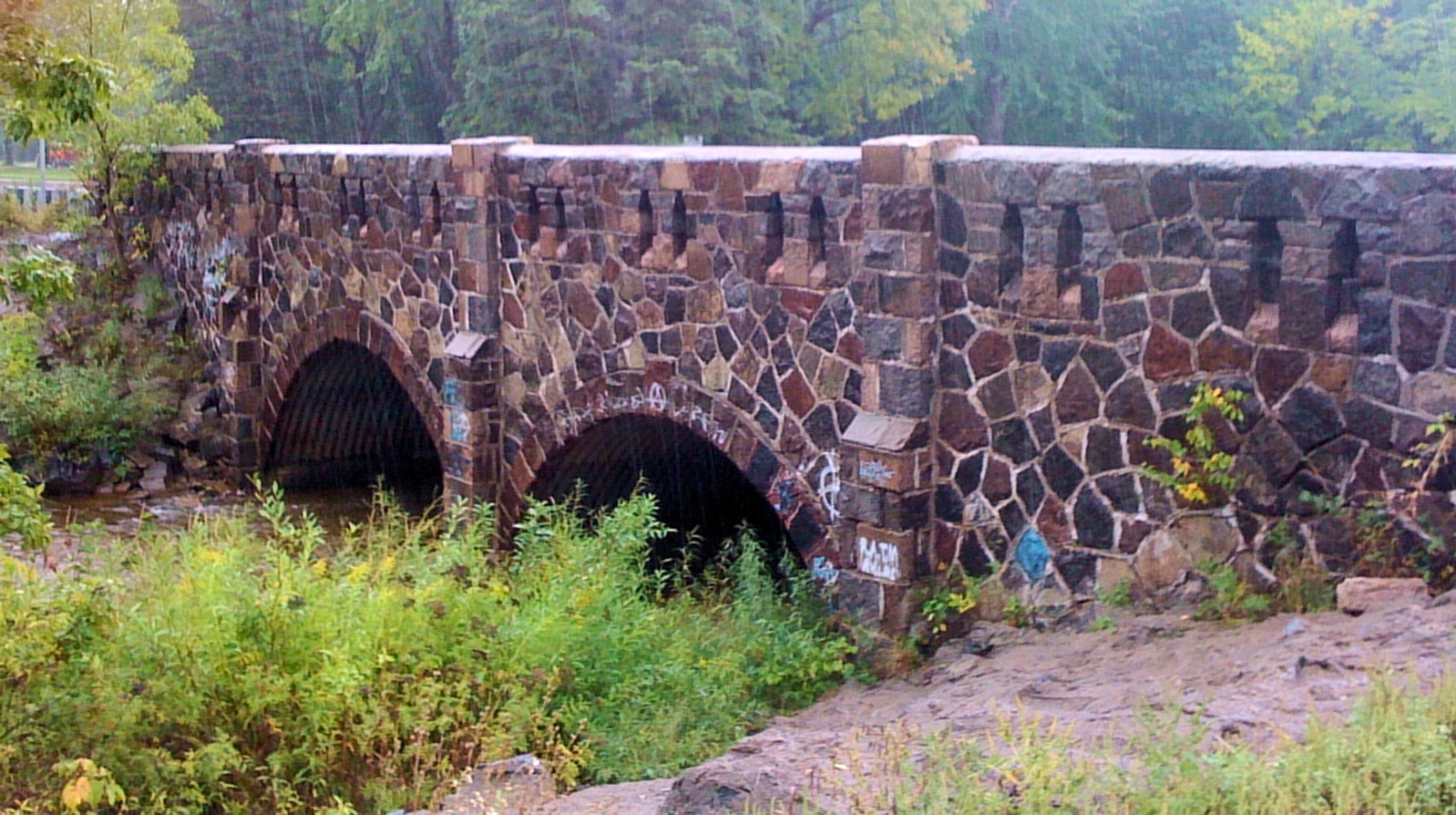
- Bridge 5757 viewed from the northwest

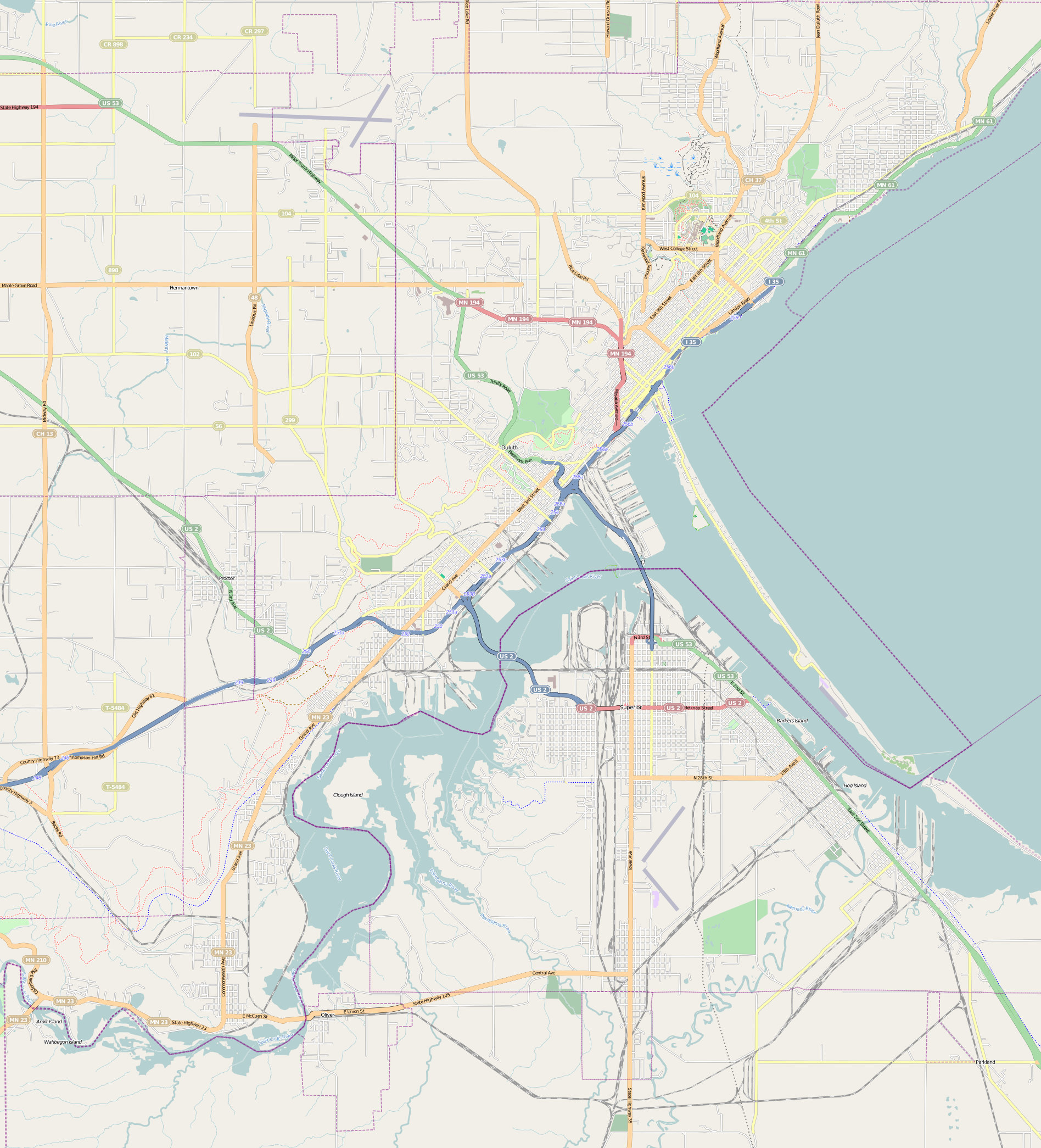
- Location within Duluth Location within Minnesota Location within the United States
- Location: MN 23 over Mission Creek, Duluth, Minnesota
- Coordinates: 46°39′38″N 92°16′32″W
- Area: Less than one acre
- Built: 1937
- Built by: A.A. Bodin and Sons
- Architect: Minnesota Highway Department
- Architectural style: Multi-plate arch
- MPS: Iron and Steel Bridges in Minnesota MPS
- NRHP reference No.: 98000720
- Added to NRHP: June 26, 1998

Bridge 5757 or the Fond du Lac Culvert is a historic bridge in the Fond du Lac neighborhood of Duluth, Minnesota, United States. It was built in 1937 to carry Minnesota State Highway 23 over Mission Creek. It is a double-span culvert built using a modular, corrugated iron product called "multi-plate", with granite headwalls. The creek flows through two 20-foot (6 m) metal culverts that are 115 feet (35 m) wide. The bridge was part of a 0.75-mile (1.2 km) section of Highway 23 built as a wide, shaded, parkway-like divided highway known as Veterans' Evergreen Memorial Highway.

Bridge 5757 has several ornamental features that distinguish it from an ordinary highway bridge. The headwalls and railings are faced with roughly-cut granite rubble in various colors of gray, pink, and tan. The headwalls continue above the roadway to form the railings, which have narrow lancet-like openings that evoke a late Gothic Revival design. While the bridge resembles New Deal projects of the 1930s, it was not actually built by a federal relief organization such as the Works Progress Administration or the Civilian Conservation Corps. Instead it was designed by the Minnesota Department of Highways (now the Minnesota Department of Transportation), probably with their chief landscape architect Arthur R. Nichols, and built by a private contractor. It resembles the National Park Service Rustic style popular in federal relief architecture, and the excellent stonework is typical of that used in the labor-intensive construction projects of that era.

Under the name Bridge No. 5757, it was listed on the National Register of Historic Places in 1998 for its local significance in the theme of engineering. It was nominated for the high artistic value of its finely crafted masonry and Gothic Revival detailing.

== See also ==
- List of bridges on the National Register of Historic Places in Minnesota
- National Register of Historic Places listings in St. Louis County, Minnesota
