= Zumbro Falls, Minnesota =

City in Minnesota, United States

Zumbro Falls
- City
- Location of Zumbro Falls, Minnesota
- Coordinates: 44°17′0″N 92°25′29″W
- Country: United States
- State: Minnesota
- County: Wabasha

Area
  - Total: 0.62 sq mi (1.60 km^{2})
  - Land: 0.58 sq mi (1.51 km^{2})
  - Water: 0.031 sq mi (0.08 km^{2})
- Elevation: 843 ft (257 m)

Population (2020)
  - Total: 155
  - Density: 265.1/sq mi (102.34/km^{2})
- Time zone: UTC-6 (Central (CST))
  - Summer (DST): UTC-5 (CDT)
- ZIP code: 55991
- Area code: 507
- FIPS code: 27-72310
- GNIS feature ID: 0654507
- Website: https://zumbrofallsmn.org/

Zumbro Falls is a city along the Zumbro River in Wabasha County, Minnesota, United States. The population was 155 at the 2020 census. U.S. Highway 63 and Minnesota 60 intersect in Zumbro Falls.

== History ==
The original settlement on the south side of the Zumbro River dates back to 1857. A grist-mill dam built in 1866 created the falls for which the town is named. Numerous floods have swept away all but a few traces of the dam. Frequent flooding and a tornado prompted relocation to the north of the river. A railroad arrived in the relocated settlement in 1881. The city was incorporated in 1898.

In September 2010, the city was flooded again, and evacuated. Many buildings were destroyed or damaged.

The city contains two properties listed on the National Register of Historic Places: the 1937 Zumbro Parkway Bridge and the 1938 Bridge 5827.

== Geography ==
According to the United States Census Bureau, the city has a total area of 0.61 square miles (1.58 km^{2}); 0.58 square miles (1.50 km^{2}) is land and 0.03 square miles (0.08 km^{2}) is water.

U.S. Highway 63 and Minnesota Highway 60 are two of the main routes in the community.

== Demographics ==
Historical population
Census	Pop.	Note	%±
1900	173		—
1910	208		20.2%
1920	193		−7.2%
1930	186		−3.6%
1940	212		14.0%
1950	172		−18.9%
1960	164		−4.7%
1970	203		23.8%
1980	208		2.5%
1990	237		13.9%
2000	177		−25.3%
2010	207		16.9%
2020	155		−25.1%
U.S. Decennial Census

=== 2010 census ===
As of the census of 2010, there were 207 people, 84 households, and 54 families living in the city. The population density was 356.9 inhabitants per square mile (137.8/km^{2}). There were 90 housing units at an average density of 155.2 per square mile (59.9/km^{2}). The racial makeup of the city was 93.7% White, 1.0% African American, and 5.3% from two or more races. Hispanic or Latino of any race were 0.5% of the population.

There were 84 households, of which 32.1% had children under the age of 18 living with them, 48.8% were married couples living together, 9.5% had a female householder with no husband present, 6.0% had a male householder with no wife present, and 35.7% were non-families. 25.0% of all households were made up of individuals, and 7.2% had someone living alone who was 65 years of age or older. The average household size was 2.46 and the average family size was 2.98.

The median age in the city was 35.2 years. 27.1% of residents were under the age of 18; 7.6% were between the ages of 18 and 24; 31% were from 25 to 44; 27.1% were from 45 to 64; and 7.2% were 65 years of age or older. The gender makeup of the city was 53.6% male and 46.4% female.

=== 2000 census ===
As of the census of 2000, there were 177 people, 77 households, and 46 families living in the city. The population density was 383.6 inhabitants per square mile (148.1/km^{2}). There were 81 housing units at an average density of 175.6 per square mile (67.8/km^{2}). The racial makeup of the city was 99.44% White and 0.56% Native American. Hispanic or Latino of any race were 0.56% of the population.

There were 77 households, out of which 33.8% had children under the age of 18 living with them, 50.6% were married couples living together, 6.5% had a female householder with no husband present, and 39.0% were non-families. 33.8% of all households were made up of individuals, and 6.5% had someone living alone who was 65 years of age or older. The average household size was 2.30 and the average family size was 3.00.

In the city, the population was spread out, with 26.0% under the age of 18, 9.0% from 18 to 24, 35.0% from 25 to 44, 21.5% from 45 to 64, and 8.5% who were 65 years of age or older. The median age was 37 years. For every 100 females, there were 94.5 males. For every 100 females age 18 and over, there were 95.5 males.

The median income for a household in the city was $37,188, and the median income for a family was $53,750. Males had a median income of $33,750 versus $26,250 for females. The per capita income for the city was $18,176. About 9.6% of families and 13.2% of the population were below the poverty line, including 15.9% of those under the age of eighteen and 11.1% of those 65 or over.
