= Third Street Bridge (Cannon Falls, Minnesota) =

- U.S. National Register of Historic Places
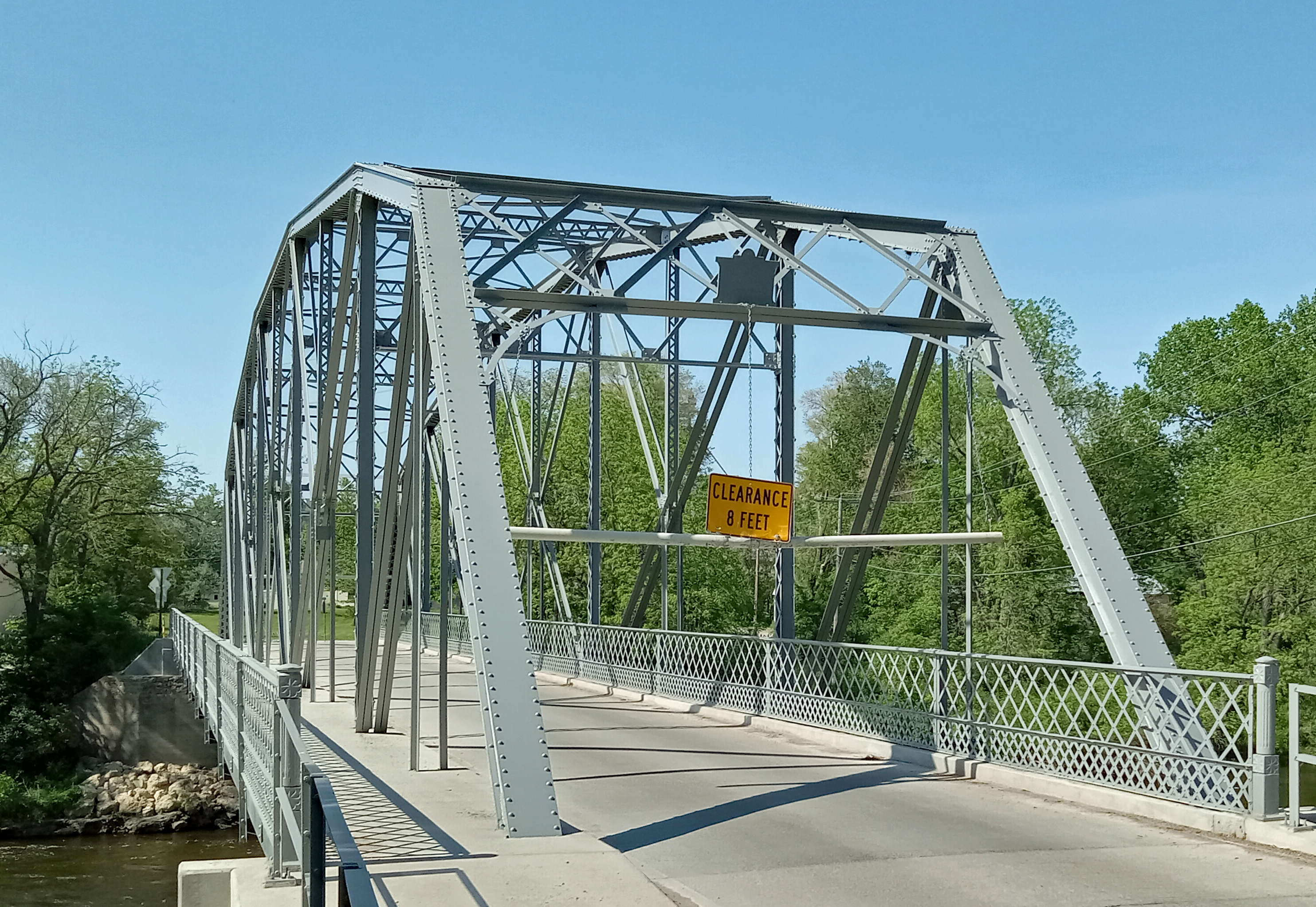
- The Third Street Bridge from the south

- Location within Minnesota Location within the United States
- Location: Third St. over Cannon River, Cannon Falls, Minnesota
- Coordinates: 44°30′48.5″N 92°54′15.3″W
- Area: less than one acre
- Built: 1909
- Built by: Bayne, A.Y. & Co.
- Engineer: Wolff, Louis P.
- Architectural style: Pennsylvania through truss
- MPS: Iron and Steel Bridges in Minnesota MPS
- NRHP reference No.: 89001836
- Added to NRHP: November 6, 1989

Third Street Bridge is a historic bridge over the Cannon River in Cannon Falls, Minnesota, United States. It is a Pennsylvania through truss bridge constructed of steel. The bridge is 184.3 feet (56.2 m) long and 17.7 feet (5.4 m) wide. It was listed on the National Register of Historic Places in 1989. It is also part of the "Iron and Steel Bridges in Minnesota" Multiple Property Nomination.

The Minnesota Highway Commission did not have design control over many bridges built in the state in the early 20th century, but they were able to influence the plans via financial incentives. Louis P. Wolff, who also designed Bridge No. 12 in Goodhue County, designed the plans for this bridge, and the city of Cannon Falls sought funding from the state. The state highway commission made some minor changes to the plans before approving them. The Pennsylvania through truss design is relatively uncommon in Minnesota.

An August 2014 report on the bridge points out that the bridge is in fair to poor condition and is posted with a weight limit of 5 tons. When the bridge was inspected, the stringers and floorbeams were corroded, the paint was failing, the bridge bearings were frozen in place, and the concrete abutments and wing walls were scaled and cracked.
