= Bridge No. 3589-Silver Creek Township =

- U.S. National Register of Historic Places
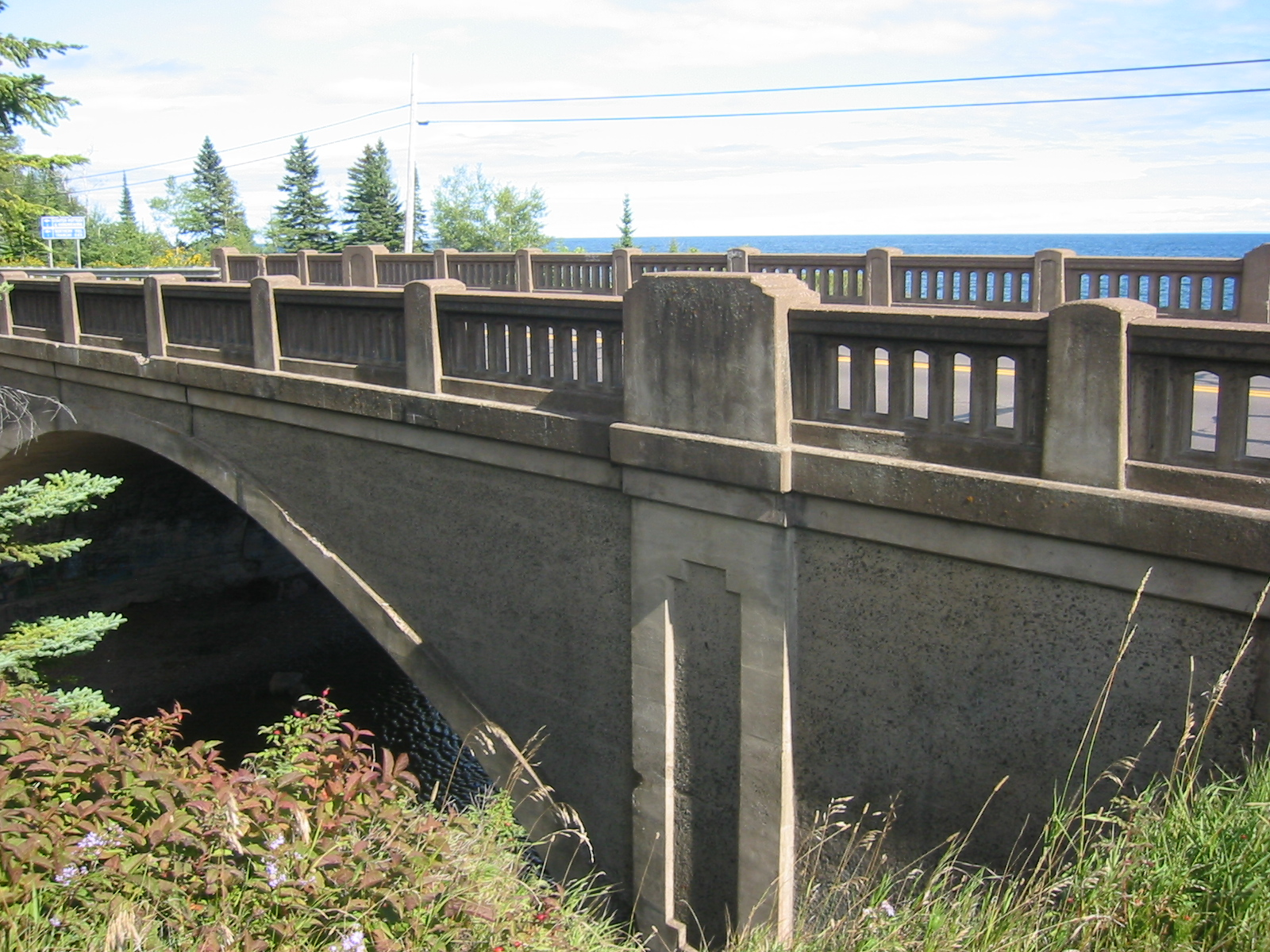
- Highway 61 bridge over Silver Creek

- Location within Minnesota
- Nearest city: Silver Creek Township, Minnesota
- Coordinates: 47°2′59″N 91°37′50″W
- Area: less than one acre
- Built: 1924
- Built by: Adams Construction Co.; et.al.
- Architect: Minnesota Highway Department
- Architectural style: Reinforced concrete arch
- MPS: Reinforced-Concrete Highway Bridges in Minnesota MPS
- NRHP reference No.: 98000686
- Added to NRHP: June 29, 1998

Bridge No. 3589 in Silver Creek Township, Minnesota is a reinforced concrete arch bridge carrying Minnesota State Highway 61 over the Stewart River just north of Two Harbors, Minnesota. The bridge was built in 1924, originally with a 70 feet (21 m) span and a width of 19 feet (5.8 m). It was widened to 39 feet (12 m) in 1939 because of increasing traffic loads. The bridge was listed on the National Register of Historic Places in 1998.

The state of Minnesota, in 1921, established a trunk highway system. Trunk Highway 1 was one of the longest routes, starting on the border of Iowa and going through Albert Lea, Minneapolis, Duluth, Two Harbors, and Grand Portage before ending at the border with Canada. The portion of Highway 1 along Lake Superior was exceptionally scenic, located on a rocky ledge cut by cascading streams. A travel writer in the 1920s wrote this about the highway:

Beyond argument, the drive on this northern shore of Lake Superior between Duluth and Port Arthur [Canada] is a natural classic. This is the land of the sky-blue water and the cathedral red rocks, where the prophetic Indian voice of Gitchie Manitou booms to the joyous loneliness amid the million sea gulls flying like snow. A most satisfying road clings to the shore, now streaming with light, now cut through somber jungle of blue-black trees.

The rock-rimmed river gorges were more economically bridged with concrete arch bridges, since the footings could be formed directly from the exposed bedrock. The bridge is notable for its Classical Revival detailing. Usually, the Minnesota Highway Department devoted more detailing to urban bridges than rural bridges, but the scenic location on a popular tourist route lent itself to a more architecturally detailed approach. As a result, the bridge was designed with open-balustrade railings, an emphatic archivolt, and monumental pilasters with recessed panels accented by contrasting concrete finishes. The original bridge was finished in 1924. By 1934, so many travelers were using the highway that the highway department proposed widening the bridge. Funds were not available until 1939, at which point the bridge was widened. The cost of widening the bridge was $12,793, and the widening respected the bridge's original design.
