= Zumbro Parkway Bridge =

- U.S. National Register of Historic Places
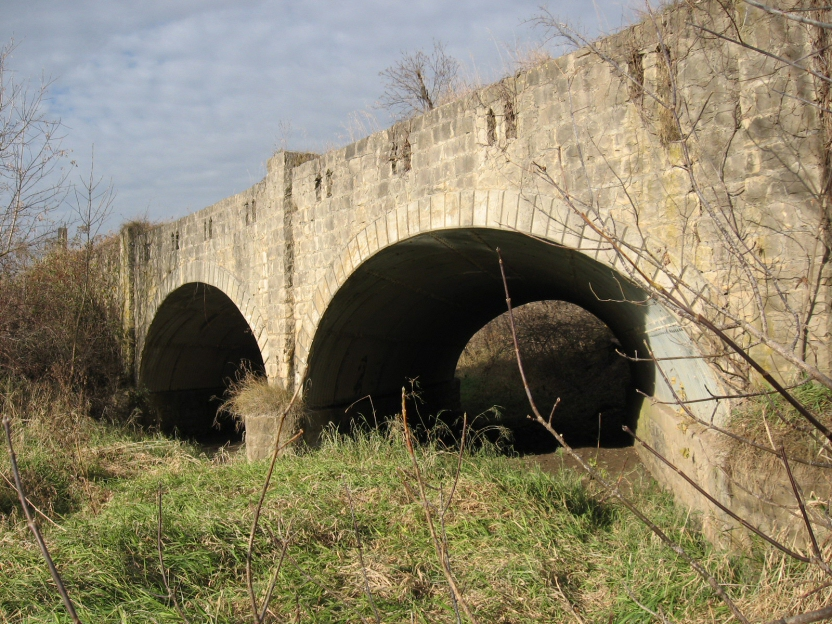
- The Zumbro Parkway Bridge from the southwest

- Location within Minnesota Location within the United States
- Location: County Road 68 over the Zumbro River, Hyde Park Township, Minnesota
- Nearest city: Zumbro Falls
- Coordinates: 44°16′47″N 92°25′20.5″W
- Area: Less than one acre
- Built: 1937
- Architect: J.M. Evans
- Architectural style: Gothic Revival
- MPS: Minnesota Masonry-Arch Highway Bridges MPS
- NRHP reference No.: 89001824
- Designated: November 6, 1989

The Zumbro Parkway Bridge is a historic arch bridge with two 25-foot (7.6 m) spans over a tributary of the Zumbro River just outside the city of Zumbro Falls in Hyde Park Township, Minnesota, United States. It was constructed in 1937 by the Works Progress Administration using a modular corrugated iron product known as Multi Plate, and given a masonry veneer with Gothic Revival details. The bridge was listed on the National Register of Historic Places in 1989 for having state-level significance in the theme of engineering. It was nominated for being one of Minnesota's finest examples of a stone-faced Multi Plate arch highway bridge, a style used in many of the state's New Deal bridge projects.

== See also ==
- List of bridges on the National Register of Historic Places in Minnesota
- National Register of Historic Places listings in Wabasha County, Minnesota
