= Stockton, Minnesota =

City in Minnesota, United States

Stockton
- City
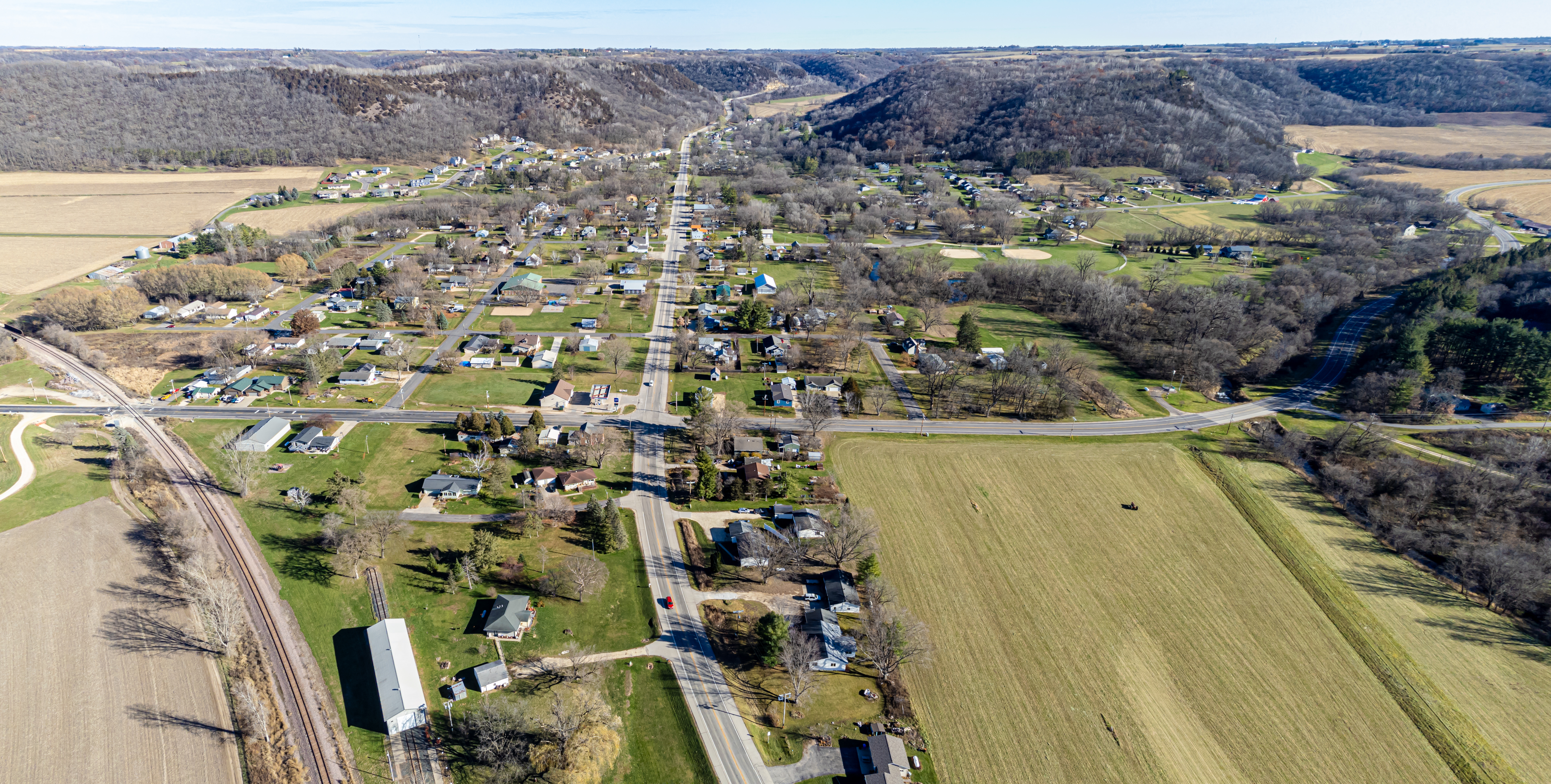
- U.S. 14 goes through town

- Location of Stockton, Minnesota
- Coordinates: 44°01′38″N 91°46′11″W
- Country: United States
- State: Minnesota
- County: Winona
- Founded: 1856

Government
  - Type: Mayor - Council

Area
  - Total: 1.70 sq mi (4.40 km^{2})
  - Land: 1.70 sq mi (4.40 km^{2})
  - Water: 0 sq mi (0.00 km^{2})
- Elevation: 758 ft (231 m)

Population (2020)
  - Total: 809
  - Estimate (2021): 811
  - Density: 476.2/sq mi (183.86/km^{2})
- Time zone: UTC-6 (CST)
  - Summer (DST): UTC-5 (CDT)
- ZIP code: 55988
- Area code: 507
- FIPS code: 27-62896
- GNIS feature ID: 2395971
- Website: ci.stockton.mn.us

Stockton is a city in Winona County, Minnesota, United States. The population was 809 at the 2020 census.

== History ==
Stockton was platted in 1856. The city was named after J. B. Stockton, an early landowner. A post office was established at Stockton in 1855, and remained in operation until 1959. The city has one property listed on the National Register of Historic Places, the 1859 Trinity Episcopal Church. The Winona and St. Peter Railroad was founded in 1861 in Winona, Minnesota. The first 11 miles from Winona to Stockton were completed by the end of 1862, making it the second operational railroad in Minnesota, after the St Paul and Pacific Line from St. Paul to St. Anthony Falls. In 2009, the city expanded, annexing the Garvin View Estate subdivision. The subdivision brought municipal water to the town.

== Geography ==
According to the United States Census Bureau, the city has a total area of 1.70 square miles (4.40 km^{2}), all land.

== Demographics ==
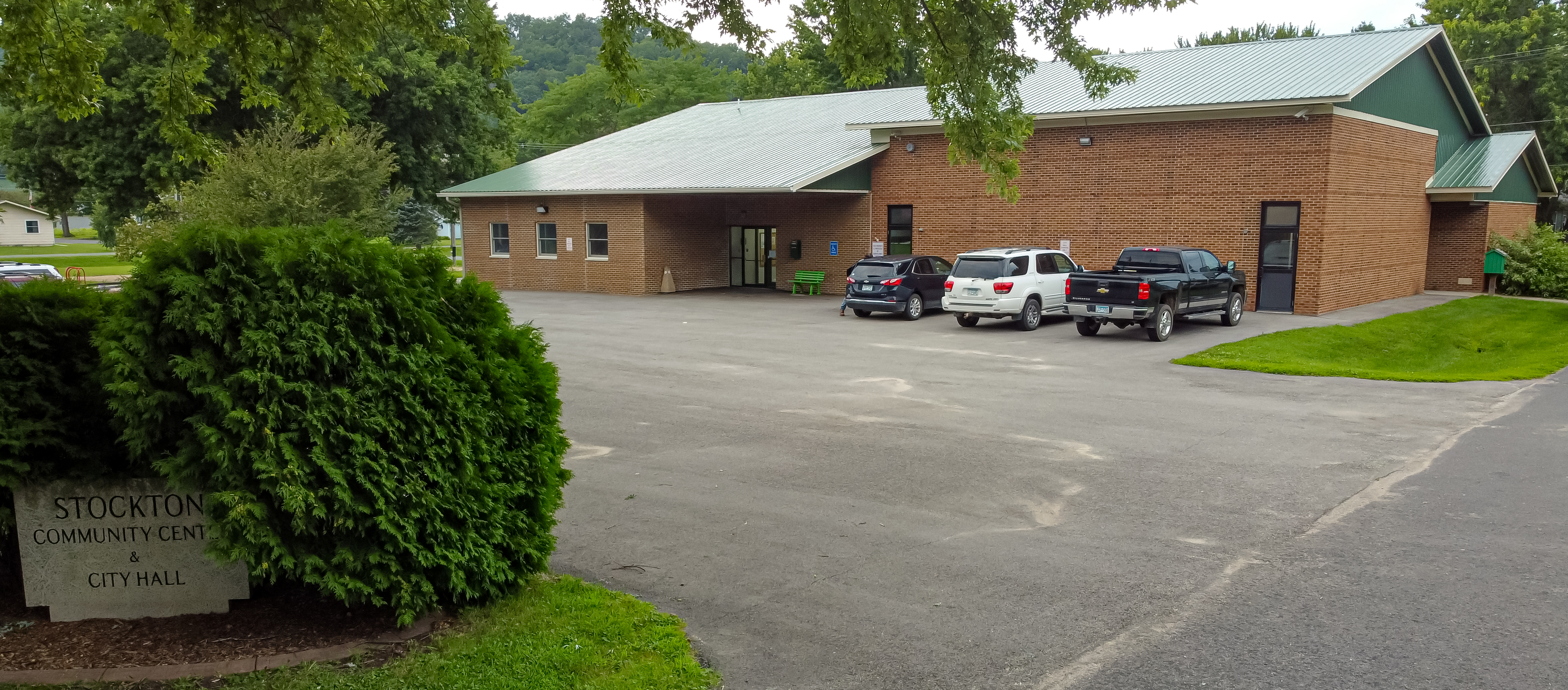
Stockton City Hall and Hillsdale Town Hall

Historical population
Census	Pop.	Note	%±
1880	214		—
1950	235		—
1960	242		3.0%
1970	346		43.0%
1980	517		49.4%
1990	529		2.3%
2000	682		28.9%
2010	697		2.2%
2020	809		16.1%
2021 (est.)	811		0.2%
U.S. Decennial Census; 2020 Census

=== 2010 census ===
As of the census of 2010, there were 697 people, 260 households, and 194 families living in the city. The population density was 410.0 inhabitants per square mile (158.3/km^{2}). There were 282 housing units at an average density of 165.9 per square mile (64.1/km^{2}). The racial makeup of the city was 95.8% White, 0.7% African American, 2.4% Asian, 0.4% from other races, and 0.6% from two or more races. Hispanic or Latino of any race were 1.7% of the population.

There were 260 households, of which 34.2% had children under the age of 18 living with them, 60.8% were married couples living together, 7.3% had a female householder with no husband present, 6.5% had a male householder with no wife present, and 25.4% were non-families. 18.5% of all households were made up of individuals, and 5% had someone living alone who was 65 years of age or older. The average household size was 2.68 and the average family size was 3.02.

The median age in the city was 35.9 years. 25.4% of residents were under the age of 18; 7.8% were between the ages of 18 and 24; 27.3% were from 25 to 44; 30.6% were from 45 to 64; and 9% were 65 years of age or older. The gender makeup of the city was 51.2% male and 48.8% female.

=== 2000 census ===
As of the census of 2000, there were 682 people, 236 households, and 184 families living in the city. The population density was 419.0 inhabitants per square mile (161.8/km^{2}). There were 246 housing units at an average density of 151.1 per square mile (58.3/km^{2}). The racial makeup of the city was 99.12% White, 0.44% Native American, 0.15% Asian, and 0.29% from two or more races. Hispanic or Latino of any race were 0.29% of the population.

There were 236 households, out of which 44.5% had children under the age of 18 living with them, 61.4% were married couples living together, 8.9% had a female householder with no husband present, and 22.0% were non-families. 17.4% of all households were made up of individuals, and 7.2% had someone living alone who was 65 years of age or older. The average household size was 2.89 and the average family size was 3.26.

In the city, the population was spread out, with 32.1% under the age of 18, 9.2% from 18 to 24, 32.3% from 25 to 44, 17.7% from 45 to 64, and 8.7% who were 65 years of age or older. The median age was 31 years. For every 100 females, there were 107.9 males. For every 100 females age 18 and over, there were 101.3 males.

The median income for a household in the city was $41,250, and the median income for a family was $47,159. Males had a median income of $30,000 versus $22,778 for females. The per capita income for the city was $17,038. About 1.7% of families and 4.1% of the population were below the poverty line, including 5.7% of those under age 18 and 1.6% of those age 65 or over.

== Notable people ==
- Dr. Helen Putnam
