= Bridge No. 8096 =

Bridge in Northfield, Minnesota

- U.S. National Register of Historic Places
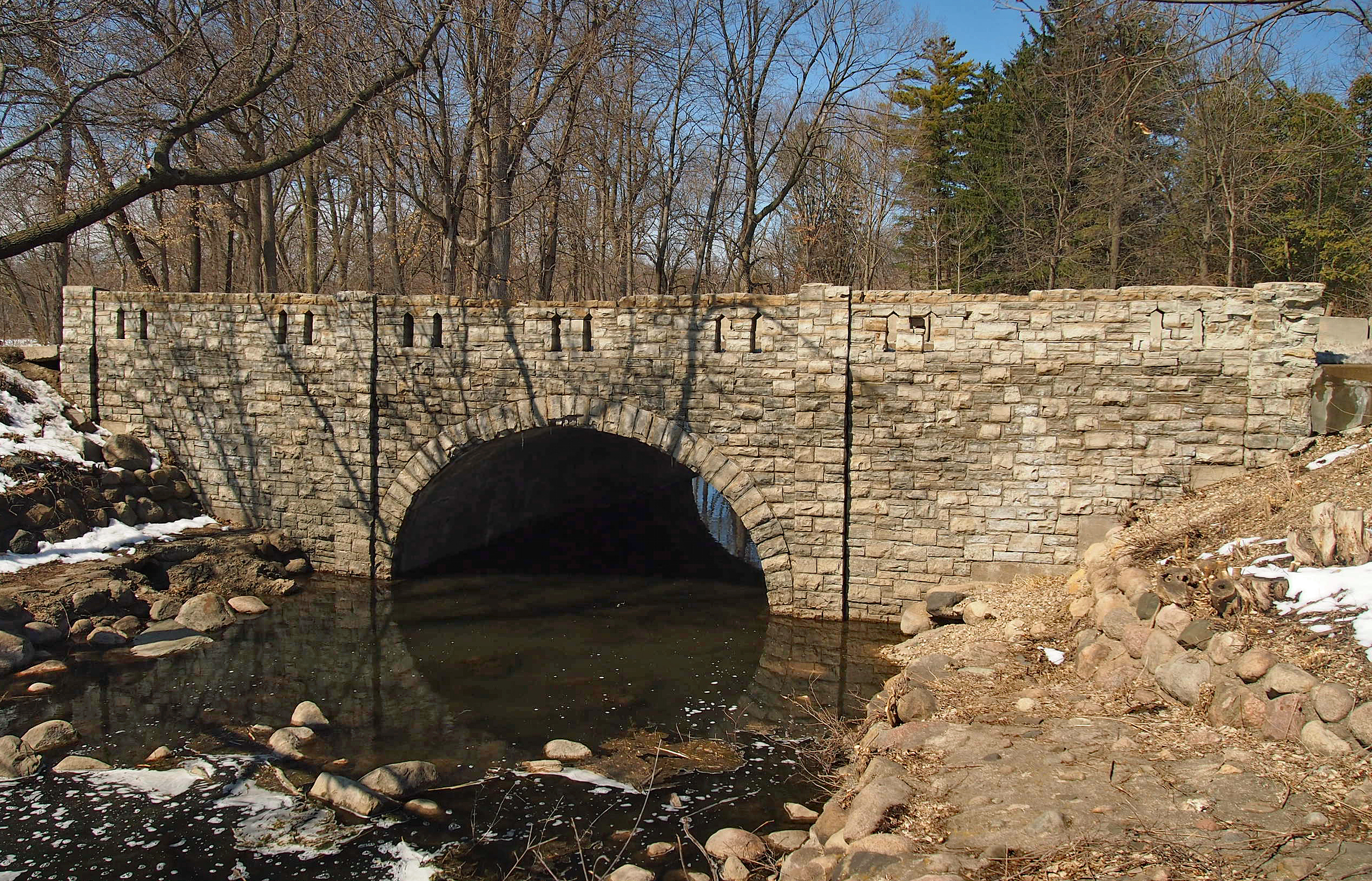

- Location within Minnesota
- Location: Minnesota State Highway 19 over Spring Cr., Northfield, Minnesota
- Coordinates: 44°27′51″N 93°09′13″W
- Area: less than one acre
- Built: 1947
- Built by: Minnesota Highway Department
- Architectural style: reinforced concrete arch
- MPS: Reinforced-Concrete Highway Bridges in Minnesota MPS
- NRHP reference No.: 98000719
- Added to NRHP: June 26, 1998

Bridge No. 8096 is a reinforced concrete deck arch bridge in Northfield, Minnesota, near the campus of Carleton College. The bridge was originally built in 1918 and was 18 feet (5.5 m) wide. In 1947, the bridge was widened to a 36 feet (11 m) roadway and two sidewalks by extending both sides. The sides were covered in limestone in the Late Gothic Revival style. Some of the detailing included buttressed pilasters around the arch opening and abutment retaining walls, along with parapet railings decorated with pointed arches. The bridge was listed on the National Register of Historic Places in 1998.

The masonry facing was unusual for work done in 1946. The Minnesota Highway Department was usually designing clean-lined Modernist bridge plans in this period. Two bridges built in the late 1930s had similar plans, when New Deal work-relief projects trended toward natural materials and labor-intensive craftsmanship. The reconstruction of Bridge No. 8096 may have been designed in that same era, or perhaps the Minnesota Highway Department thought that a Gothic Revival aesthetic was more appropriate for a crossing near a college campus.
