= Mendota Road Bridge =

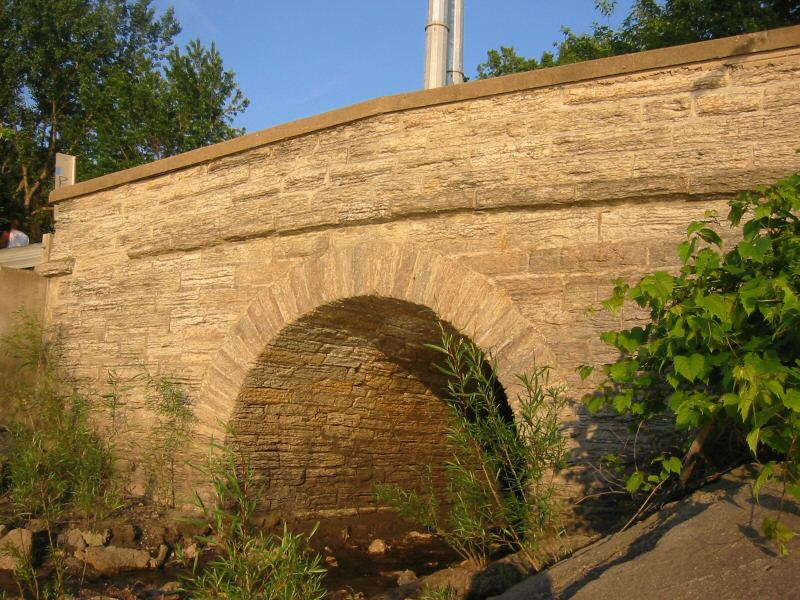
- The Mendota Road Bridge as viewed from the Mississippi River side.
- Coordinates: 44°55′30″N 93°06′43″W
- Carries: Two lanes of Water Street
- Crosses: The outlet of Pickerel Lake
- Locale: St. Paul, Minnesota
- ID number: 90401
- Mendota Road Bridge
- U.S. National Register of Historic Places
- Location within Minnesota Location within the United States
- Location: Water St. over Pickerel Lake Outlet, St. Paul, Minnesota
- Coordinates: 44°55′29″N 93°06′43″W
- Area: less than one acre
- Built: 1894
- Architect: City of St. Paul Engineer's Office
- Architectural style: Stone-arch bridge
- MPS: Minnesota Masonry-Arch Highway Bridges MPS
- NRHP reference No.: 89001825
- Added to NRHP: November 06, 1989

Characteristics
- Design: Arch bridge
- Width: 24 feet (7.3 m)
- Longest span: 10 feet (3.0 m)

History
- Opened: 1894

Statistics
- Daily traffic: 500

Mendota Road Bridge is a stone arch bridge that spans the outlet of Pickerel Lake where it meets the Mississippi River just south of downtown St. Paul, Minnesota, USA. It was built in 1894 by the city of St. Paul and was designed by the St. Paul City Engineer's Office.

The bridge is historically significant as an example of a small-scale 19th century stone arch highway bridge. The stone used in the bridge is locally quarried gray limestone. Ornamentation on the bridge includes protruding keystones at the top of the arch, a slight peak at the top of the arch, and a string course that matches the roadway level. The bridge resembles other stone arch bridges built in Minnesota townships during the late 19th century and early 20th century, but the ornamentation sets it apart. Another facet of historical importance is the fact that the bridge has never been substantially altered during its lifetime, except for a concrete cap replacing the original coping at the top of the railings. The bridge has been listed in the National Register of Historic Places (#89001825) due to its historical integrity.
