= Bridge No. 12 =

- U.S. National Register of Historic Places
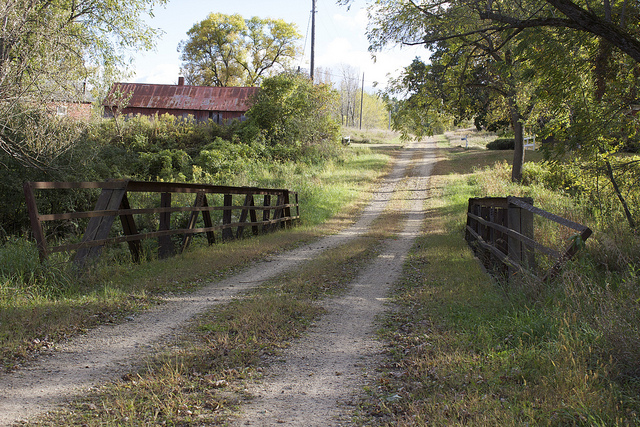

- Location within Minnesota Location within the United States
- Nearest city: Red Wing, Minnesota
- Coordinates: 44°32′31″N 92°26′19″W
- Area: less than one acre
- Built: 1908
- Built by: Glardon, William P.
- Architect: Wolff, Louis P.
- Architectural style: Warren pony truss
- MPS: Iron and Steel Bridges in Minnesota MPS
- NRHP reference No.: 89001837
- Added to NRHP: November 6, 1989

Bridge No. 12 is a Warren pony truss bridge in Hay Creek Township, Minnesota. The bridge is 63 feet (19 m) long and 16 feet (4.9 m) wide and carries Township Road 43 over Bullard Creek. It is built of angle sections riveted together, as recommended in the engineering textbook The Design of Highway Bridges published in 1908. During this time, the state government was attempting to standardize design and construction of bridges by financial incentives, rather than proposing legislation.

The county commissioners of Goodhue County decided in late 1907 to build a bridge over Bullard Creek, but they were dissatisfied with the first round of bids. In the spring of 1908, Louis P. Wolff proposed a bridge that would comply with Minnesota Highway Commission rules and regulations. By building a bridge that complied with the rules, the state would subsidize the cost of the bridge through road and bridge appropriations. The county commissioners approved of these ideas and paid Wolff $100 for the plans and blueprints. William P. Glardon from Red Wing, Minnesota was the contractor, and the Minneapolis Steel & Machinery Company fabricated the steel.

The bridge is listed on the Iron and Steel Bridges in Minnesota Multiple Property Submission.
