= Tischer Creek =

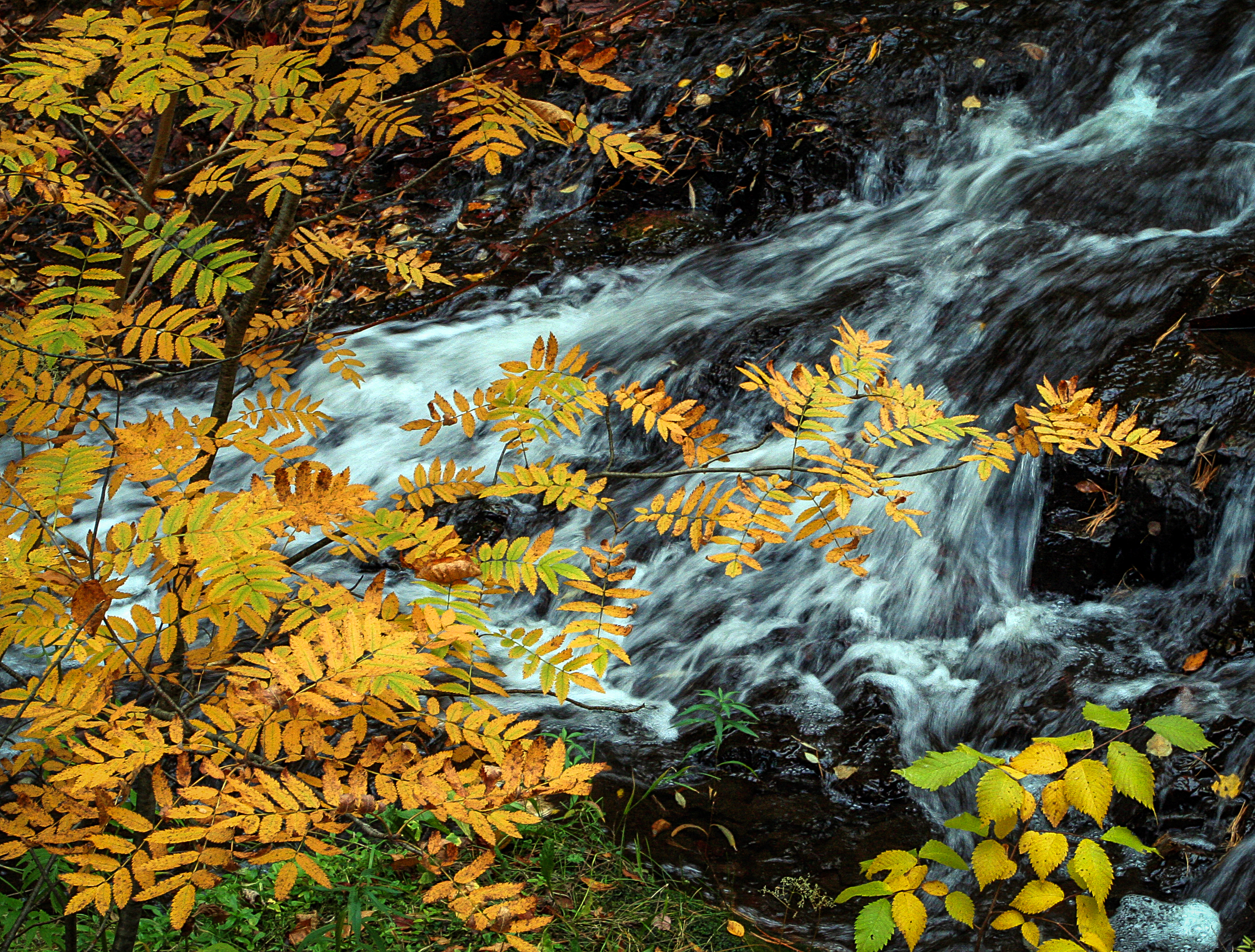

- Location of mouth

Location
- Country: United States
- State: Minnesota
- County: St. Louis County

Physical characteristics
- Mouth
  - coordinates: 46°48′50.5″N 92°03′06″W

Basin features
- River system: Lake Superior

Tischer Creek is a stream in the U.S. state of Minnesota. It empties into Lake Superior in the city of Duluth on the grounds of the Glensheen Historic Estate. Its waters supply a 60,000 gallon reservoir and are used to maintain the grounds of the estate.

Tischer Creek was named after Urs and Elizabeth Tischer, pioneers who settled the area in the 1850s.
