= Hillsdale Township, Winona County, Minnesota =

Hillsdale Township, Minnesota
- Township
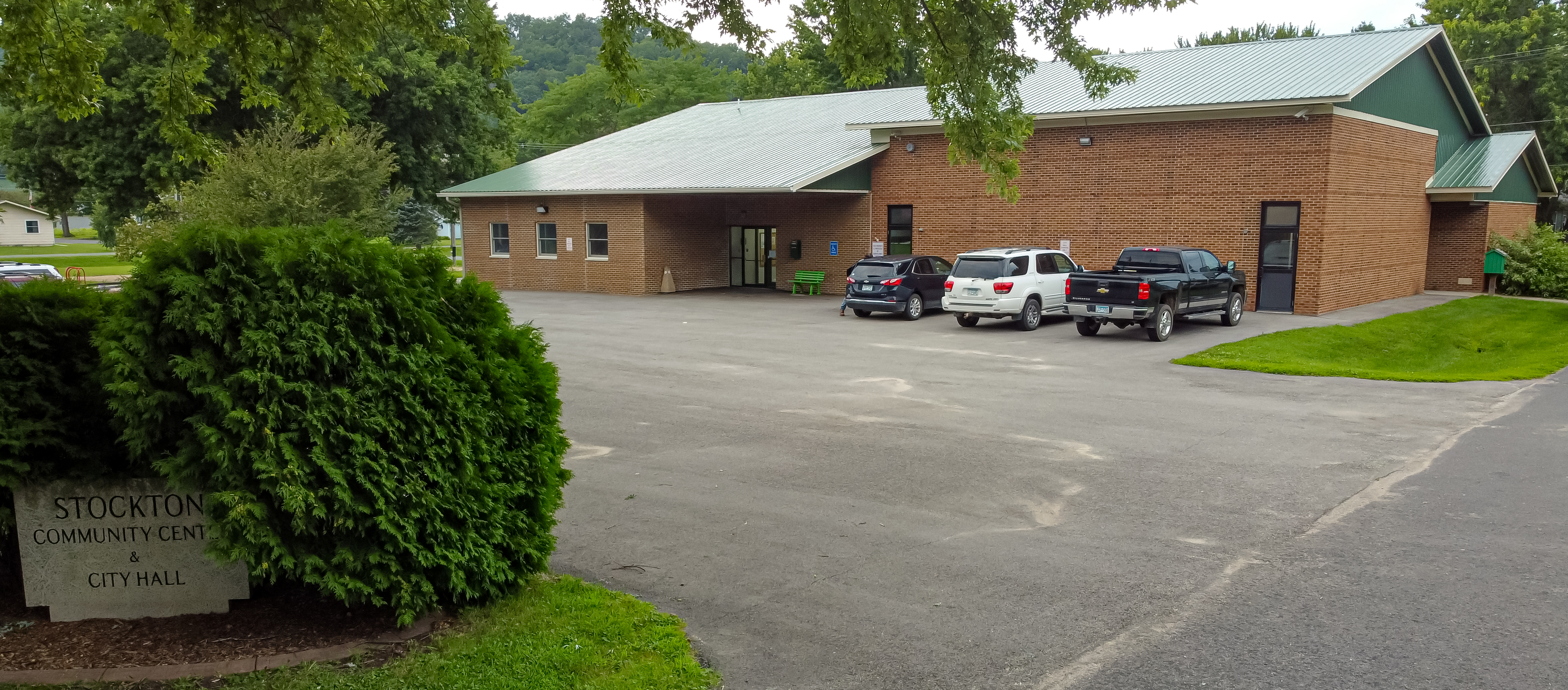
- Town hall shared at the Stockton City Hall

- Location within the state of Minnesota Hillsdale Township, Minnesota (the United States)
- Coordinates: 44°1′45″N 91°46′57″W
- Country: United States
- State: Minnesota
- County: Winona

Area
  - Total: 16.1 sq mi (41.6 km^{2})
  - Land: 16.1 sq mi (41.6 km^{2})
  - Water: 0 sq mi (0.0 km^{2})
- Elevation: 1,175 ft (358 m)

Population (2010)
  - Total: 912
  - Density: 56.8/sq mi (21.9/km^{2})
- Time zone: UTC-6 (Central (CST))
  - Summer (DST): UTC-5 (CDT)
- FIPS code: 27-29222
- GNIS feature ID: 0664481

Hillsdale Township is a township in Winona County, Minnesota, United States. The population was 912 at the 2010 census.

Hillsdale Township was organized in 1858, and named for the hills and dales within its borders.

== Geography ==
According to the United States Census Bureau, the township has a total area of 16.1 square miles (42 km^{2}); 16.1 square miles (42 km^{2}) is land and 0.04 square miles (0.10 km^{2}), or 0.12%, is water.

== Demographics ==
As of the census of 2000, there were 945 people, 367 households, and 249 families residing in the township. The population density was 58.8 inhabitants per square mile (22.7/km^{2}). There were 385 housing units at an average density of 24.0 per square mile (9.3/km^{2}). The racial makeup of the township was 96.51% White, 0.21% African American, 0.95% Asian, 0.32% from other races, and 2.01% from two or more races. Hispanic or Latino of any race were 1.59% of the population.

There were 367 households, out of which 38.4% had children under the age of 18 living with them, 45.5% were married couples living together, 16.3% had a female householder with no husband present, and 31.9% were non-families. 21.0% of all households were made up of individuals, and 4.1% had someone living alone who was 65 years of age or older. The average household size was 2.57 and the average family size was 3.00.

In the township the population was spread out, with 30.4% under the age of 18, 9.8% from 18 to 24, 34.6% from 25 to 44, 18.7% from 45 to 64, and 6.5% who were 65 years of age or older. The median age was 31 years. For every 100 females, there were 101.9 males. For every 100 females age 18 and over, there were 99.4 males.

The median income for a household in the township was $33,750, and the median income for a family was $37,625. Males had a median income of $25,444 versus $22,337 for females. The per capita income for the township was $16,345. About 11.2% of families and 13.3% of the population were below the poverty line, including 23.7% of those under age 18 and 5.9% of those age 65 or over.
