= Bridge No. 90646 =

- U.S. National Register of Historic Places
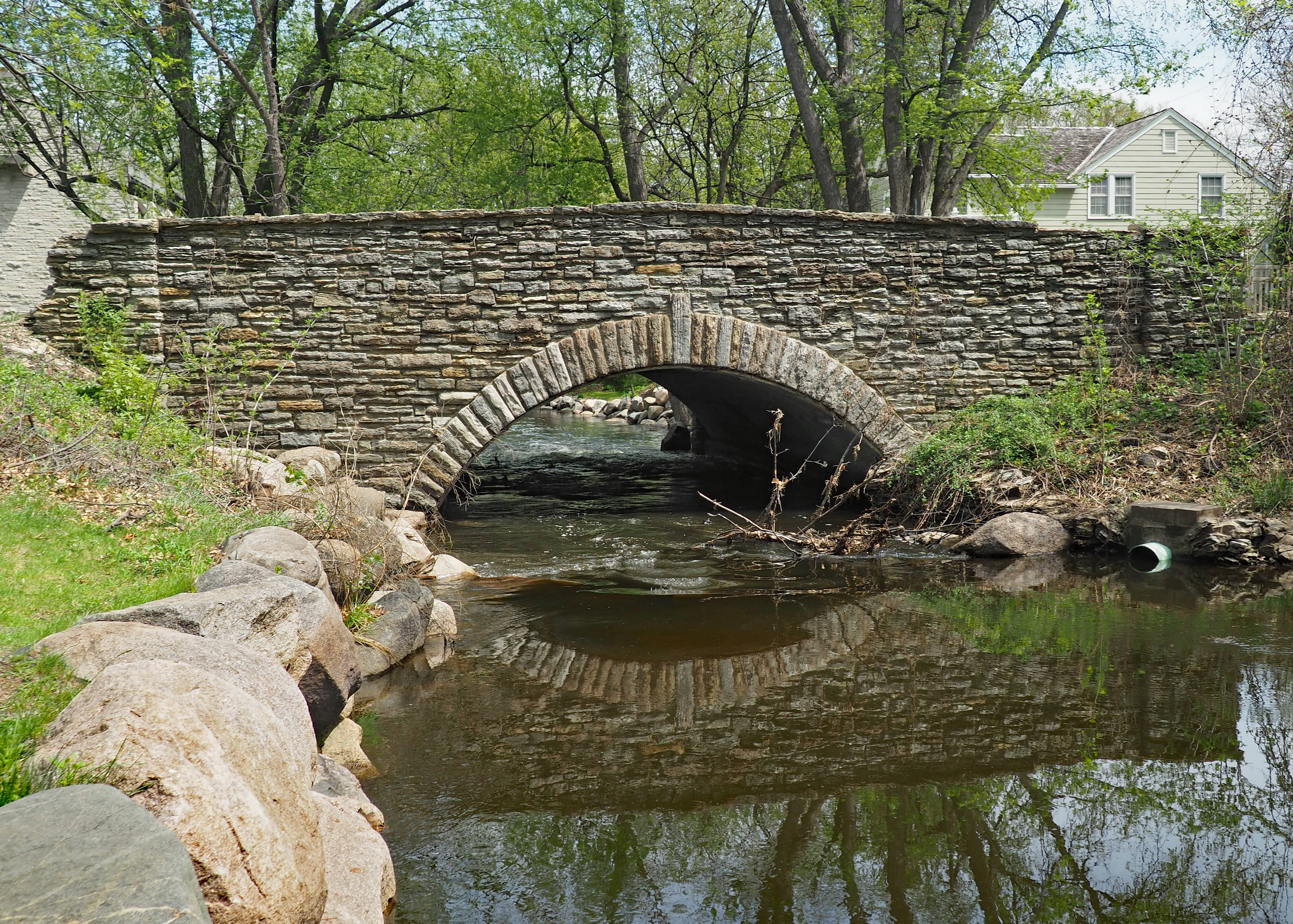
- Bridge No. 90646 viewed from the west

- Location within Minnesota Location within the United States
- Location: 4400 W. 50th St., Edina, Minnesota
- Coordinates: 44°54′42″N 93°20′21″W
- Area: 0.02 acres (0.0081 ha)
- Built: 1937
- Built by: Works Progress Administration
- Architect: Lyle Culvert & Pipe Company
- MPS: Iron & Steel Bridges in MN, 1873-1945
- NRHP reference No.: 15001016
- Added to NRHP: February 2, 2016

Bridge No. 90646, also known as the Wooddale Avenue Bridge, is a multi-plate steel arch bridge that carries a local street over Minnehaha Creek in Edina, Minnesota, United States. The bridge was listed on the National Register of Historic Places in February 2016.

== History ==
The area was originally part of the George W. Baird farm, but in the 1920s much of the farmstead was sold off for development. In 1922, the Edina Country Club housing subdivision was platted, just north of the bridge and north of 50th Street. The Edina Country Club, west of the bridge, was opened in 1923, and other portions of Edina were being developed as well. As traffic increased, the original steel beam bridge was no longer sufficient to accommodate all the vehicles, so the city of Edina sought a replacement in 1937.

On March 8, 1937, the Edina City Council accepted the proposal by Lyle Culvert & Pipe Company to build an Armco multi-plate arch bridge. The facing was proposed to be irregularly coursed boulder stone, designed in the WPA Rustic style. Construction began in May 1937, but in July 1937, the design of the stone facing was changed from boulder stone to limestone. This was done to harmonize with the limestone veneer on the nearby St. Stephen's Episcopal Church. The construction schedule did not appear to be set back. Construction was largely complete in August 1937, and a city newsletter published in September 1937 shows the completed bridge.

== Design and construction ==
The bridge is 21 feet (6.4 m) long, has a span length of 18 feet (5.5 m), and a width of 40.4 feet (12.3 m). It is faced with Platteville limestone.

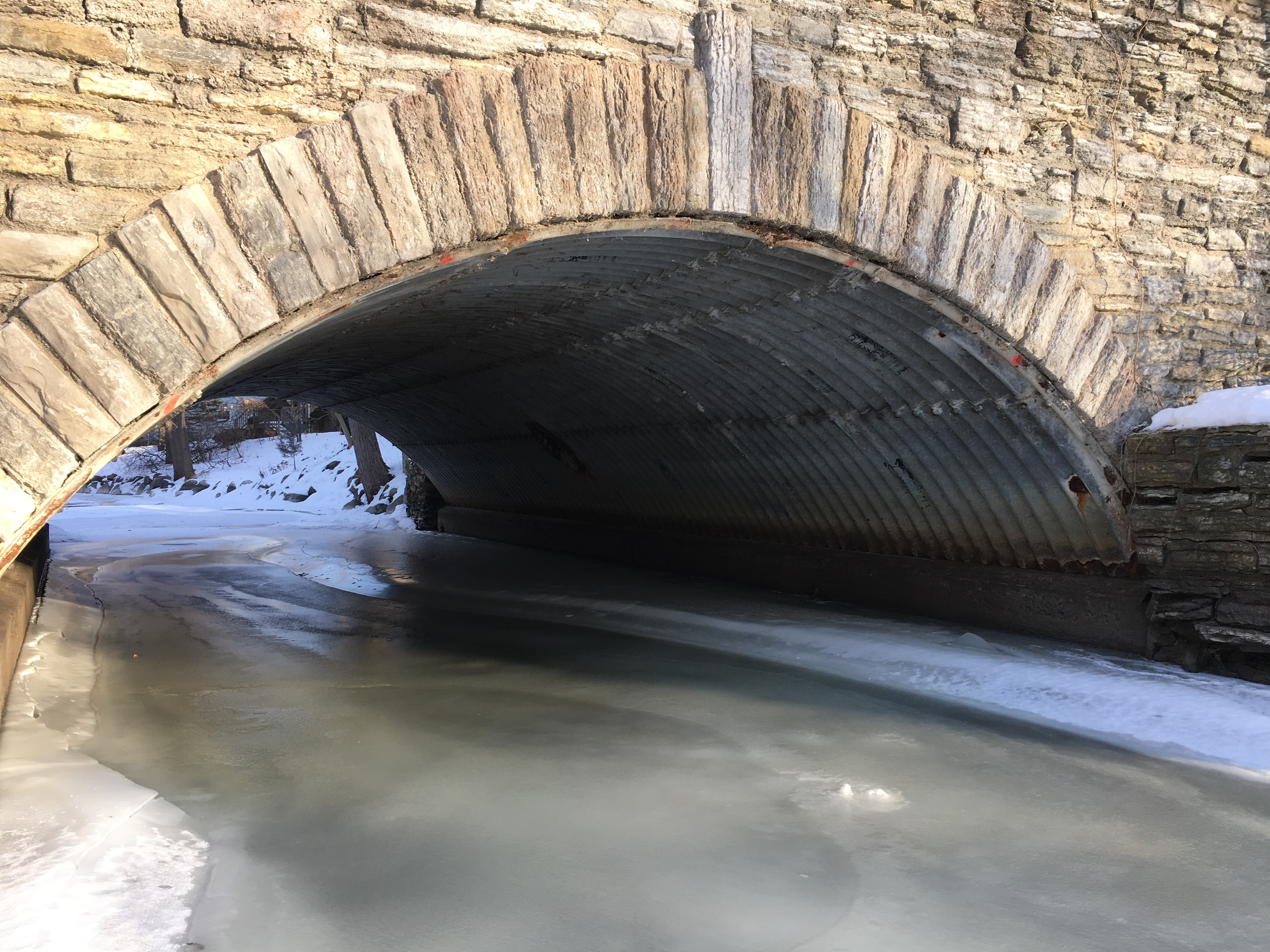
Detail of the underside of the bridge, showing the corrugated steel

The multi-plate arch bridge design was introduced in 1931 by the Armco Culvert Manufacturer's Association. The plates are made of galvanized corrugated steel, manufactured in curved segments, and assembled on site to build an arch. The corrugations, about 6 inches (150 mm) wide and 1.5 inches (38 mm) deep, formed a very strong bridge. The multi-plate arch design was popular in the 1930s as an alternative to reinforced concrete slab-and-girder construction for bridges with a short span. The bridge could also be assembled by unskilled labor, and the stone masonry was labor-intensive, so the Works Progress Administration was able to employ a number of people in its construction. While many multi-plate arch bridges were built in Minnesota during the Great Depression, bridges of that type are increasingly rare. A 1988 survey found 35 surviving multi-plate arch bridges in the state, but in 2014, only eight of these bridges were left.

== Consideration of removal ==
In December 2022, the City of Edina announced that the bridge is being considered for major renovations or complete replacement due to the deteriorating limestone railings and steel arches.

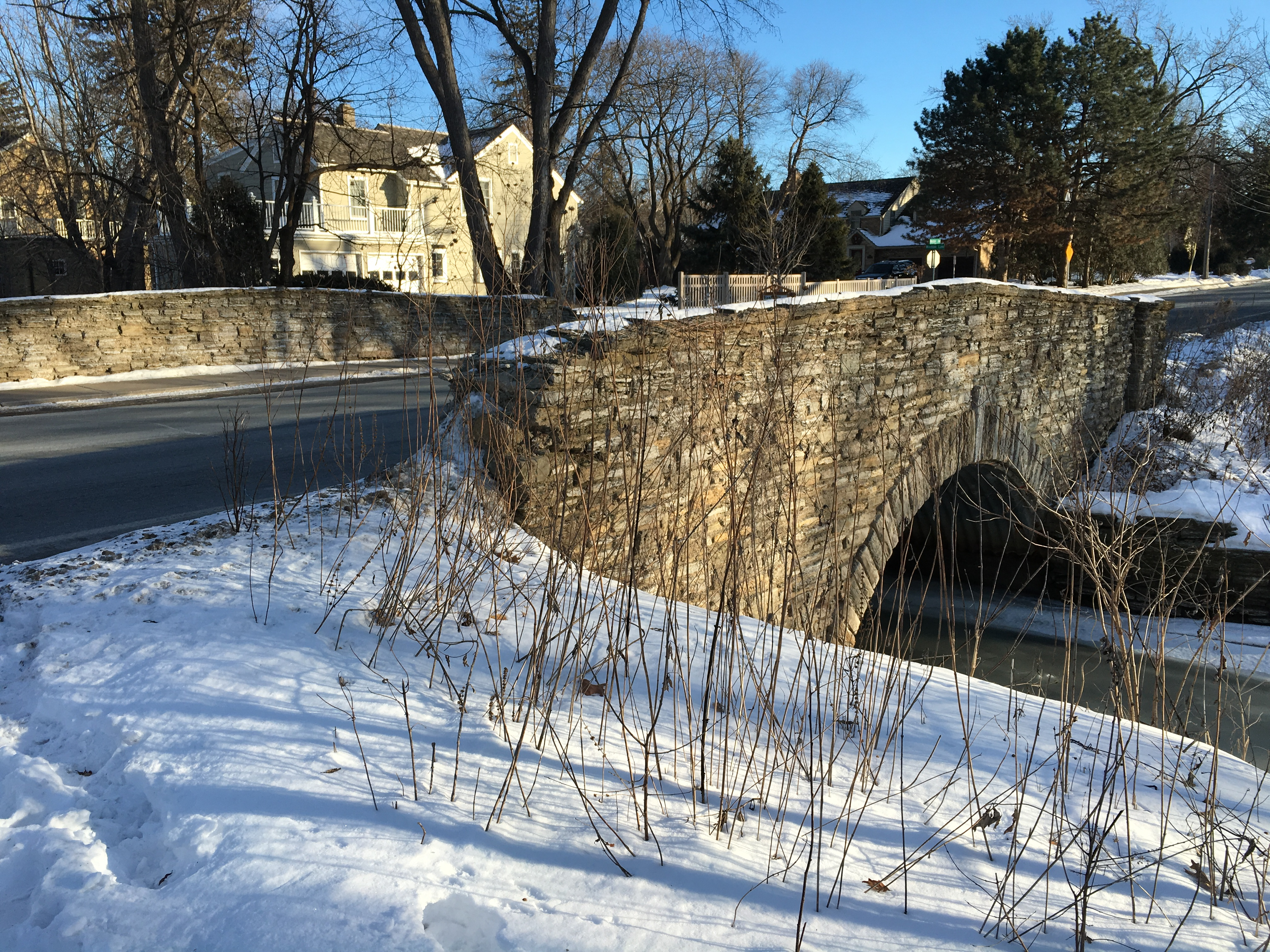
View of the bridge from road level

== See also ==
- National Register of Historic Places listings in Hennepin County, Minnesota
