= National Register of Historic Places listings in Lyon County, Minnesota =

Location of Lyon County in Minnesota

This is a list of the National Register of Historic Places listings in Lyon County, Minnesota. It is intended to be a complete list of the properties and districts on the National Register of Historic Places in Lyon County, Minnesota, United States. The locations of National Register properties and districts for which the latitude and longitude coordinates are included below, may be seen in an online map.

There are 12 properties and districts listed on the National Register in the county.

This National Park Service list is complete through NPS recent listings posted August 1, 2025.

== Current listings ==
	Name on the Register	Image	Date listed	Location	City or town	Description
1	J. S. Anderson House	J. S. Anderson House	March 15, 1982 (#82002984)	402 E. 2nd St. 44°33′33″N 95°58′58″W	Minneota	Unusual Queen Anne/Colonial Revival house with a three-story rear tower, built circa 1896.
2	O. G. Anderson & Co. Store	O. G. Anderson & Co. Store	March 15, 1982 (#82002985)	Jefferson St. 44°33′40″N 95°59′14″W	Minneota	Well-preserved early-20th-century commercial building—constructed in 1901 with an upper-floor event space—and home until 1972 of a prominent regional retailer.
3	Bridge No. 5083-Marshall	Bridge No. 5083-Marshall	June 29, 1998 (#98000682)	Minnesota Highway 19 over the Redwood River; 44°26′57″N 95°47′08″W	Marshall	1931 concrete girder bridge with decorative metal lampposts, a rare surviving example of the ornamental urban highway bridges built in Minnesota before World War II.
4	Bridge No. 5151-Marshall	Bridge No. 5151-Marshall	June 29, 1998 (#98000683)	Minnesota Highway 19 over the Redwood River; 44°26′35″N 95°47′59″W	Marshall	1931 concrete girder bridge with decorative metal lampposts, a rare surviving example of the ornamental urban highway bridges built in Minnesota before World War II.
5	Camden State Park CCC/WPA/Rustic Style Historic District	Camden State Park CCC/WPA/Rustic Style Historic District	April 19, 1991 (#89001669)	Off Minnesota Highway 23 southwest of Lynd; 44°22′04″N 95°55′29″W	Lynd vicinity	13 park facilities built 1934–38, significant as examples of New Deal federal work relief, National Park Service rustic architecture using split stone construction, and master planning around the natural topography.
6	First National Bank	First National Bank	March 15, 1982 (#82002987)	101 3rd St. 44°13′56″N 95°37′13″W	Tracy	Prominent Romanesque Revival commercial building constructed of local Sioux Quartzite, built in 1897 for Lyon County's oldest bank (active 1891–1931).
7	William F. Gieske House	William F. Gieske House	March 15, 1982 (#82002982)	601 W. Lyon; 44°27′04″N 95°47′36″W	Marshall	Distinctive Stick style house built circa 1900–1905 for William F. Gieske (1869–1931), president of the mill complex that helped turn Marshall into a regional milling center.
8	Kiel & Morgan Hotel/Lyon County Courthouse	Kiel & Morgan Hotel/Lyon County Courthouse	March 15, 1982 (#82002981)	Off County Highway 5; 44°23′36″N 95°53′31″W	Lynd	Circa-1871 hotel where county business was first regularly conducted, a rare surviving example of the early structures pressed into government service as western Minnesota was first settled and organized by Euro-Americans.
9	Masonic Temple Delta Lodge No. 119	Masonic Temple Delta Lodge No. 119	March 15, 1982 (#82002983)	325 W. Main; 44°26′52″N 95°47′26″W	Marshall	One of Minnesota's most complete examples of Egyptian Revival architecture, a Masonic Temple built in 1917.
10	Martin Norseth House	Martin Norseth House	March 15, 1982 (#82002980)	86 E. Main; 44°36′33″N 95°40′14″W	Cottonwood	Distinctive Colonial Revival house built circa 1898 for Martin Norseth (1859–1911), who launched Cottonwood's commercial development.
11	St. Paul's Evangelical Lutheran Church & Parsonage	St. Paul's Evangelical Lutheran Church & Parsonage	March 15, 1982 (#82002986)	412–414 E. Lyon St. 44°33′30″N 95°58′57″W	Minneota	1891 parsonage and 1895 church built by the Icelandic immigrants who settled in southwest Minnesota, forming the second-largest colony from that nation in the U.S.
12	Tracy Municipal Building and Armory		July 18, 2023 (#100009130)	336–372 Morgan St. 44°14′02″N 95°37′12″W	Tracy	1938 multipurpose municipal building with a 1958 armory—the long-serving center of Tracy's local government and services, community recreation, and National Guard unit.

== See also ==
- List of National Historic Landmarks in Minnesota
- National Register of Historic Places listings in Minnesota
