= Disappearance of Brandon Swanson =

2008 Minnesota missing person case

Brandon Swanson
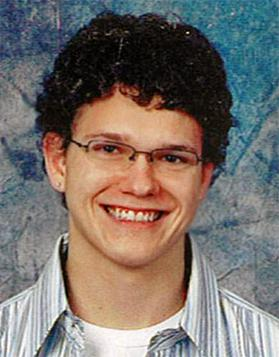
- Image of Swanson distributed in the wake of his disappearance
- Born: January 30, 1989; Marshall, Minnesota, U.S.
- Disappeared: May 14, 2008 (aged 19); Porter, Minnesota, U.S.
- Status: Missing for 18 years, 5 months and 30 days
- Education: Marshall Senior High School
- Alma mater: Minnesota West Community and Technical College
- Known for: "Brandon's Law"
- Height: 5 ft 6 in (168 cm)
- Parents: Brian Swanson (father); Annette Swanson (mother)

Shortly after midnight on May 14, 2008, Brandon Swanson (born January 30, 1989) of Marshall, Minnesota, United States, drove his car into a ditch on his way home from celebrating the end of the spring semester with fellow students from Minnesota West Community and Technical College's Canby campus. Uninjured, he got out and called his parents on his cellphone. Unsure of his exact location, he told them he believed he was near Lynd, and they drove out to pick him up; however, they were unable to locate him or his vehicle. Swanson remained on the phone with them until he went silent 47 minutes later after exclaiming "Oh, shit!" He has not been seen or heard from since.

In the morning, Swanson’s parents reported him missing to police, who advised them to wait as such behavior was not uncommon for young men his age. Later that day, the circumstances of his disappearance became more complicated when his cell phone records showed he had been near Porter, 25 miles (40 km) from where Swanson had said he was, in a different direction. That information led to the discovery of his car in a ditch near Taunton with the car doors open and keys missing.

It is not known whether Swanson was aware of this discrepancy when he talked to his parents. Foul play has not been ruled out, but it has also been proposed that he might have accidentally fallen into the Yellow Medicine River, near where his car was found, and drowned, although extensive searches have not found a body. Land searches, with dogs, continued in the area for several years. His parents successfully lobbied the state legislature to pass Brandon's Law, which requires that police begin investigations of missing adults promptly.

== Background ==
A native of Marshall, Lyon County, in southwestern Minnesota, Swanson graduated from Marshall High School in 2007. He then chose to study wind turbines for a year at the Minnesota West Community and Technical College campus in Canby.

Classes at Minnesota West ended for the academic year on May 13, 2008. Swanson stayed in Canby for the evening to celebrate with friends. He was witnessed drinking alcohol at two different parties, but his friends say he was not visibly intoxicated.

== Disappearance ==
Swanson left Canby for the 30-mile (48 km) drive home before midnight. Just before 2 a.m., he called his parents on his cell phone, telling them he had driven his Chevrolet Lumina off the road and into a ditch from which he could not remove the car. He was not hurt and asked them to come to where he was and pick him up.

Annette and Brian Swanson got in their pickup truck and drove out to where they thought he was, keeping him on the phone despite occasional hangups and drops. Brandon stayed with his car and tried to signal them by flashing his lights on and off, but they saw nothing, nor did he see them do the same.

Brandon finally gave up and told them he was leaving the car to walk toward lights he could see that led him to believe he was near Lynd, a small town roughly 7 miles (11 km) southwest of Marshall. He told his father to head for the parking lot of a local bar and wait for him there. Brian began driving there, talking to his son as he did.

Shortly after 2:30, 47 minutes into the call, Brandon suddenly interrupted himself on the phone and said "Oh, shit!" He was silent for the remainder of the call, until his parents hung up and made multiple attempts to call him back. Brandon has not been seen or heard from since.

== Investigation ==
At 6:30 a.m., his parents reported Brandon missing to the Lynd police. They were told at first that it was hardly unusual for young men that age to stay out all night after the last day of college classes. Annette Swanson specifically recalled that one of the officers said it was Brandon's "right to be missing".

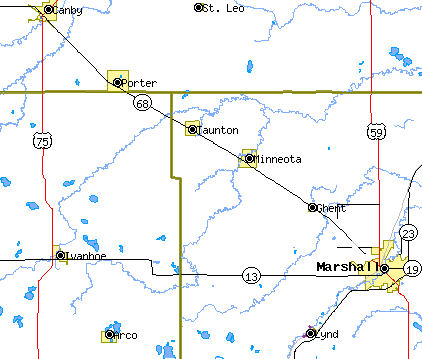
Map of the area northwest and southwest of Marshall

Later that morning the Lynd police did start a search, but found no trace of Brandon in the town or outside. They requested that the office of Lyon County sheriff Joel Dahl assist them. To better focus the search, the sheriff's office obtained Brandon's cell phone records, which revealed that Brandon had been calling from the vicinity of Taunton, along State Highway 68, the main route to Canby, northwest of Marshall—25 miles (40 km) from Lynd.

Searching in that area, deputies discovered Brandon's abandoned car in a ditch off a gravel road along the Lincoln County line one mile (1.6 km) north of Highway 68, bringing the office of that county's sheriff, Jack Vizecky, into the investigation as well. He told the media that the Lumina had gotten hung up on the top of an incline at the edge of the road, not seriously enough to damage the car but enough to keep the wheels from touching the ground on that side. There was nothing else found amiss with the car, and due to the grass and gravel in the area surrounding it, there were no tracks and thus no way to tell what direction Brandon might have started walking.

His cellphone call had been routed through a tower at the intersection of County Routes 3 and 10 near Minneota, another town along Highway 68. By May 15, the call had been determined to have come from within 5 miles (8.0 km) of the tower; searchers were concentrating their efforts there. Since part of that circle included Yellow Medicine County to the north, authorities from that jurisdiction also took part.

Deputy Dahl noted that from the area, a red light atop a Taunton grain elevator could be seen. He thought that it was possible that the red light Brandon had seen had led him to believe Lynd was within walking distance. Ground searches were being complemented with a flyover by an aerial team; search dogs were also brought in from the Twin Cities. A team of bloodhounds from nearby Codington County, South Dakota, picked up a 3-mile (4.8 km) scent trail that largely followed the field roads west-northwest to an abandoned farm, then along the Yellow Medicine River to a point where it appeared to enter the stream.

Brandon had mentioned passing fences and hearing nearby water, his father recalled. On the theory that Brandon might have drowned, boats from the state's Department of Natural Resources were deployed along the river, and gates were installed. In some areas in Lincoln County, the water had been 10 feet (3.0 m) deep on the morning of the disappearance, but had gone down since then, Dahl noted. Deputies also walked the river's banks, and horses and all-terrain vehicles were deployed in the surrounding area. However, Dahl ruled out a more organized, extensive ground search.

=== Later searches ===
After the original search found no sign of Swanson, most efforts were discontinued. Sheriff Vizecky continued to walk the two miles (3.2 km) of the Yellow Medicine in that area every day for 30 days. The Swansons left their porch light on all night every night as a symbol of their hope that Brandon would eventually return, a practice they continued for at least five years.

Searches resumed late that fall, after fields planted shortly after the disappearance had been harvested. Dogs on those searches continued to follow scents of human remains into an area northwest of Porter that had not been searched earlier. Efforts picked up again in the spring, after snow melted but before planting; a cycle that continued through 2011. By that time, 122 square miles (320 km^{2}) had been searched.

In 2010, the Minnesota Bureau of Criminal Apprehension took over as lead agency on the case. It set up a tip line; by 2015, 90 leads had been reported that way. By that point, when official searches resumed, the area of interest had moved towards Mud Creek, a tributary of the Yellow Medicine north and northwest of Porter.

== Theories ==
While the trail followed by one of the dogs went to the Yellow Medicine River, and despite her son's last known words, Annette Swanson does not think he drowned there. After following the scent to the water, that dog continued up across the other side, and along that riverbank to another gravel road, where it continued north towards the Yellow Medicine County line and ended. "There really is nothing to indicate that he's in the river," she told CNN. Brian Swanson also recalls that, any alcohol his son had consumed earlier in the evening notwithstanding, he did not seem disoriented or confused during their phone conversations.

If Swanson is still alive, there are other possibilities, although they appear remote. He could have intentionally disappeared, but his parents do not believe he would have done that. Vizecky said he could not rule out foul play, even though there was no evidence of it. "[S]omeone [could have been] in the shadows, and they got him that way," he speculated.

== Brandon's Law ==
After the searches, Annette Swanson was still struck by the initial response of the Lynd police that her son had "a right to be missing" when she told them how old he was. "I'm his mother and I knew something was horribly wrong," she recalled later. She and Brian began lobbying for changes in state law that would require an investigation into the case of a missing adult to begin as soon as it is reported, much as was already required in cases of possibly abducted children.

Annette met with Marty Seifert, minority leader of the state House of Representatives at the time, whose district included Marshall, in a local restaurant. The two talked about the problems she had experienced with the police when she reported her son missing. "She knew it wouldn't help in her son's case, but that it could help others in the future", Seifert recalled in 2015.

Seifert introduced a bill called "Brandon's Law" that would make the required change by amending the law governing the state's existing Missing Child Program to change the word "child" to "person". He recalled considerable resistance at first from the state's law enforcement community as it was developed in committee. "Part of it had to do with privacy, especially regarding cell phones", he told the Marshall Independent. "Technology was emerging then, so there were discussions about privacy and when can they ping you and when can't they."

Dennis Frederickson introduced a companion bill in the State Senate. After it passed both houses, including unanimously in the lower chamber, in May 2009, Governor Tim Pawlenty signed it into law with the Swansons and their daughter Jamine in attendance at the ceremony.

The effect of the change also required that police, in addition to determining in their preliminary investigation that the reported person is indeed missing, determine whether that person is potentially in dangerous circumstances. They must also notify other nearby law enforcement agencies promptly. Brandon's Law also clarifies that the agency taking the report is the lead agency investigating the case; the absence of that distinction had created some problems in the later phases of the initial search when three different counties were involved. Police were no longer allowed to refuse a report based on an initial belief that no criminal activity was involved, the brevity of the interval since the person was last seen, the possibility that the person may have intentionally disappeared, or the lack of a relationship between the missing person and the reporter.

Following the governor's signature, the law took effect at the beginning of July 2009. Four other states have passed similar laws. Seifert left the legislature in 2010, but he still has the pen Pawlenty used to sign the bill into law. "I consider it one of the most important bills I authored in my 14 years. It will save lives."

== See also ==
- Disappearance of Suzanne Lyall, 1998 disappearance of New York college student whose parents also successfully lobbied for changes in law requiring faster and better coordinated police response in such cases
- List of people who disappeared mysteriously (2000–present)
