= Old Masonic Temple =

Old Masonic Temple may refer to:

- Old Masonic Temple (Marshall, Minnesota)
- Old Masonic Temple (Trenton, New Jersey)
