= Bill Holm =

Bill Holm may refer to:

- Bill Holm (art historian) (1925–2020), American artist, author and art historian
- Bill Holm (poet) (1943–2009), American poet, essayist, memoirist, and musician from Minnesota

== See also ==
- Billy Holm (1912–1977), Major League Baseball catcher
