= Lyon County Courthouse =

Lynn County Courthouse may refer to:

- Lyon County Courthouse (Iowa), Rock Rapids, Iowa
- Lyon County Courthouse (Kansas), Emporia, Kansas
- Kiel and Morgan Hotel, Lynd, Minnesota, formerly the Lyon County Courthouse
- Lyon County Courthouse (Nevada), Yerington, Nevada
