= Marshall Senior High School (Minnesota) =

Marshall High School

Location
- 400 Tiger Drive; Marshall, Minnesota 56258; United States; 44.4559°N 95.7518°W

Information
- Type: Public
- School district: Marshall Public School District
- Principal: Brian Jones
- Teaching staff: 56.50 (on FTE basis)
- Grades: 9 to 12
- Enrollment: 917 (2023-2024)
- Student to teacher ratio: 16.23
- Colors: Orange and Black
- Mascot: Tiger
- Website: www.marshall.k12.mn.us/o/marsh-schools-mn/page/contact-high-school

Marshall Senior High School (commonly known as Marshall High School) is a public high school located in Marshall, Minnesota, United States. The school educates students in grades 9 to 12. This high school received a GreatSchools rating of 7 out of 10 based on the students' test scores. In 2011, the 10th grade reading scores and the 11th grade science scores were both above the state average. However, the 11th grade math scores were 3% below the Minnesota state average.

== Administration ==
This is the administration as of January 13, 2025.

- Principal: Brian Jones
- Superintendent: Jeremy Williams

== Graduation requirements ==
Graduation requirements follow standards set by the Minnesota Department of Education. They must also take the Reading and Math Minnesota Comprehensive Assessments.

== Activities ==
Marshall Senior High School has a variety of activities that teach the athletes skills such as: teamwork, self-discipline, time-management, and dedication. The school offers fine art activities as well as athletic activities.

The fine art programs are:

- Band (Pep band, Jazz band, Color Guard, and Marching Band)
- BEATS
- Brennan DeVos Fan Club
- Business Professionals of America (BPA)
- Choir (Show choir, Swing choir, and Roaring Twenties)
- Future Farmers of America (FFA)
- Knowledge Bowl
- Math Team
- National Honor Society
- Musical (Fall)
- One-Act Play
- Peer Helpers
- Speech
- Student Council
- Year Book
- Youth as Resources

The athletic activities are:

- Basketball (Boys and Girls)-2001, 2002 Girls State Champions 1963 Boys State Champions
- Baseball (Boys)
- Cross Country (Boys and Girls)-2003, 2004 Boys State Champions
- Dance Team (Girls)
- Football (Boys)
- Golf (Boys and Girls)
- Gymnastics (Girls)
- Hockey (Boys and Girls)
- Soccer (Boys and Girls)
- Softball-Fastpitch (Girls)
- Swimming & Diving (Girls, Boys swim with Montevideo Senior High School)
- Tennis (Girls)
- Track (Boys and Girls)
- Volleyball (Girls)-2004, 2007, 2009, 2011, 2012, 2013 State Champions (https://www.mshsl.org/sites/default/files/2020-12/championship-matches-history-thru-2020.pdf)
- Wrestling (Boys)

The activities have 75% of the student body participating in at least one activity a year. 63% of students who participate are involved in two or more activities. The school has nine Minnesota High School League (MSHSL) Team State Champions and 67 teams compete in MSHSL state tournaments as well as many individuals competing in state tournaments.

== Notable alumni ==
- Blaise Andries, Minnesota football guard and offensive tackle
- Yahya Black, NFL defensive end for the Pittsburgh Steelers
- Bryce Lance, NFL wide receiver for the New Orleans Saints
- Gordon Forbes, Minnesota lawyer and
- Trey Lance, NFL quarterback for the Los Angeles Chargers
- Brandon Swanson, missing person since May 14, 2008
- Sean Tillman, aka Har Mar Superstar, musician
- Lois Quam, healthcare executive
