= Old Masonic Temple (Trenton, New Jersey) =

- U.S. Historic district – Contributing property
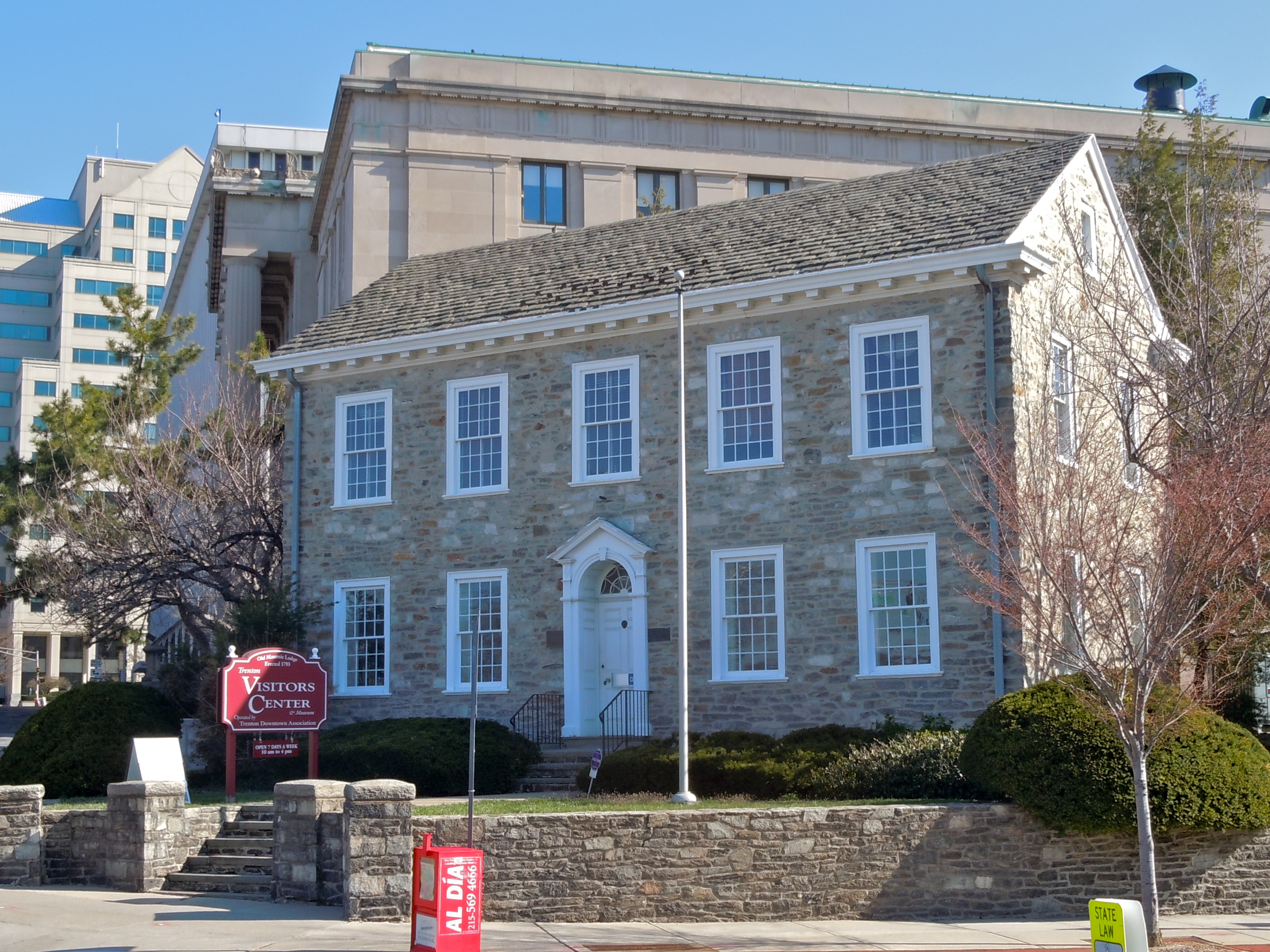
- The building now serves as a tourist information center. The 1915 Masonic Lodge is behind the old building.

- Location within Mercer County, New Jersey
- Location: Corner of W. Lafayette and Willow (or Barrack) streets, Trenton, New Jersey
- Coordinates: 40°13′09″N 74°46′06″W
- Built: 1793
- Architectural style: Colonial
- Part of: State House Historic District (ID76001161)
- Designated CP: August 27, 1976

The Old Masonic Temple in Trenton, Mercer County, New Jersey, United States, is a historic building built in 1793 at the corner of Front and Willow (or Barrack) streets near the New Jersey State House, and across the street from the Old Barracks. In 1915 when a new building was constructed for the Trenton Lodge, the old building was moved half a block south to 102 Barrack Street. It has served as a Masonic Lodge, a school, a shop for a furnisher and upholsterer, a museum, and is now a tourist information center. In 1970 the building became part of the State House Historic District listed by the National Register of Historic Places.
