= State House Historic District =

Historic district in New Jersey, United States

- State House District
- U.S. National Register of Historic Places
- U.S. Historic district
- New Jersey Register of Historic Places
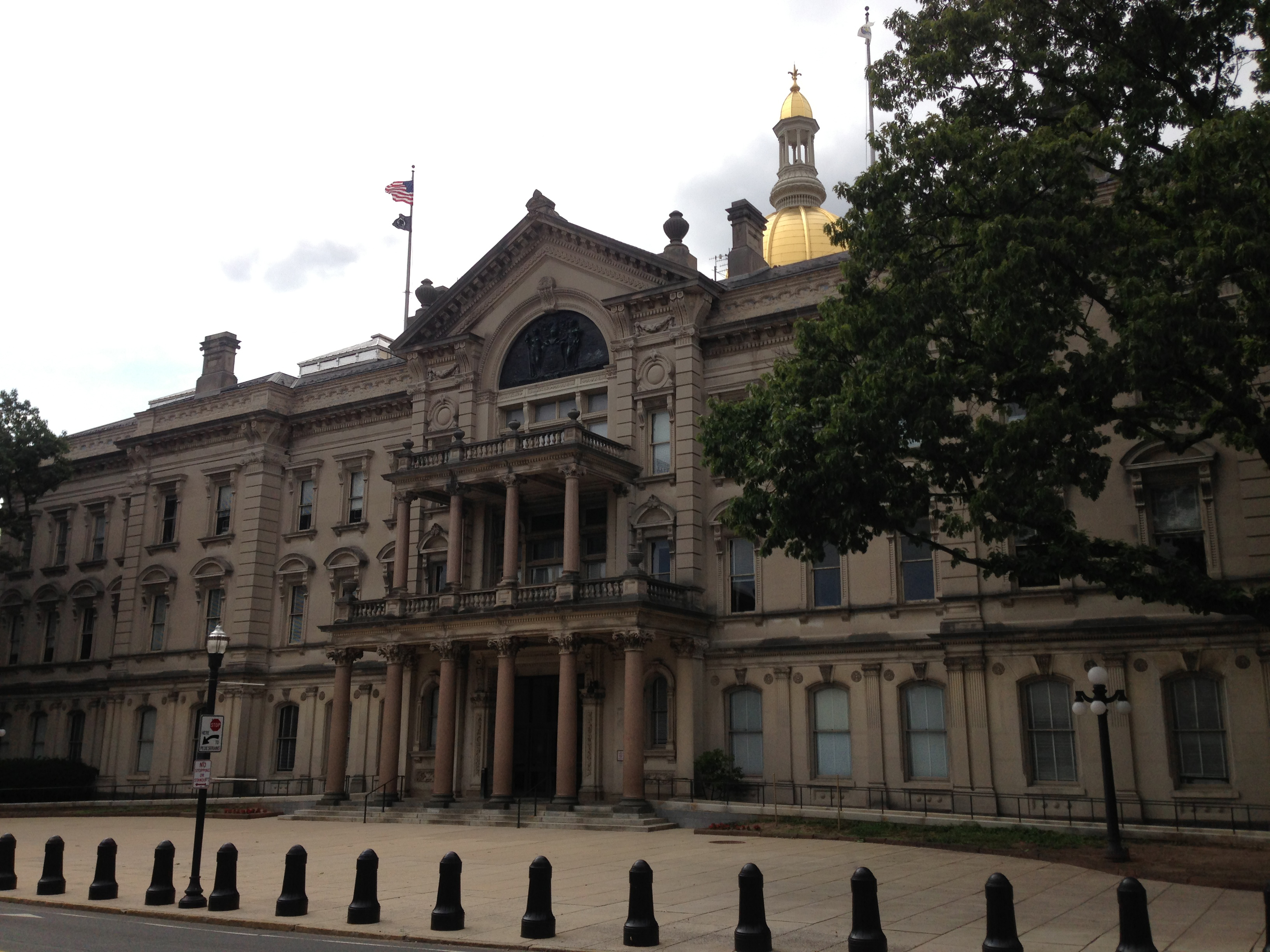
- The New Jersey State House

- Location within Mercer County, New Jersey Location within New Jersey Location within the United States
- Location: West State Street and Willow Street, Trenton, New Jersey
- Coordinates: 40°13′13.9″N 74°46′11.9″W
- Area: 25 acres (10 ha)
- Built: 18th-20th century
- Architect: Multiple
- Architectural style: Colonial, Florentine Renaissance
- NRHP reference No.: 76001161 (original); 92000295 (increase)
- NJRHP No.: 1795

Significant dates
- Added to NRHP: August 27, 1976
- Boundary increase: April 2, 1992
- Designated NJRHP: December 19, 1975

The State House Historic District encompasses many historic buildings along West State and Willow Streets in Trenton, New Jersey, including the New Jersey State House, Old Barracks Museum, and the Old Masonic Temple.

== Gallery ==
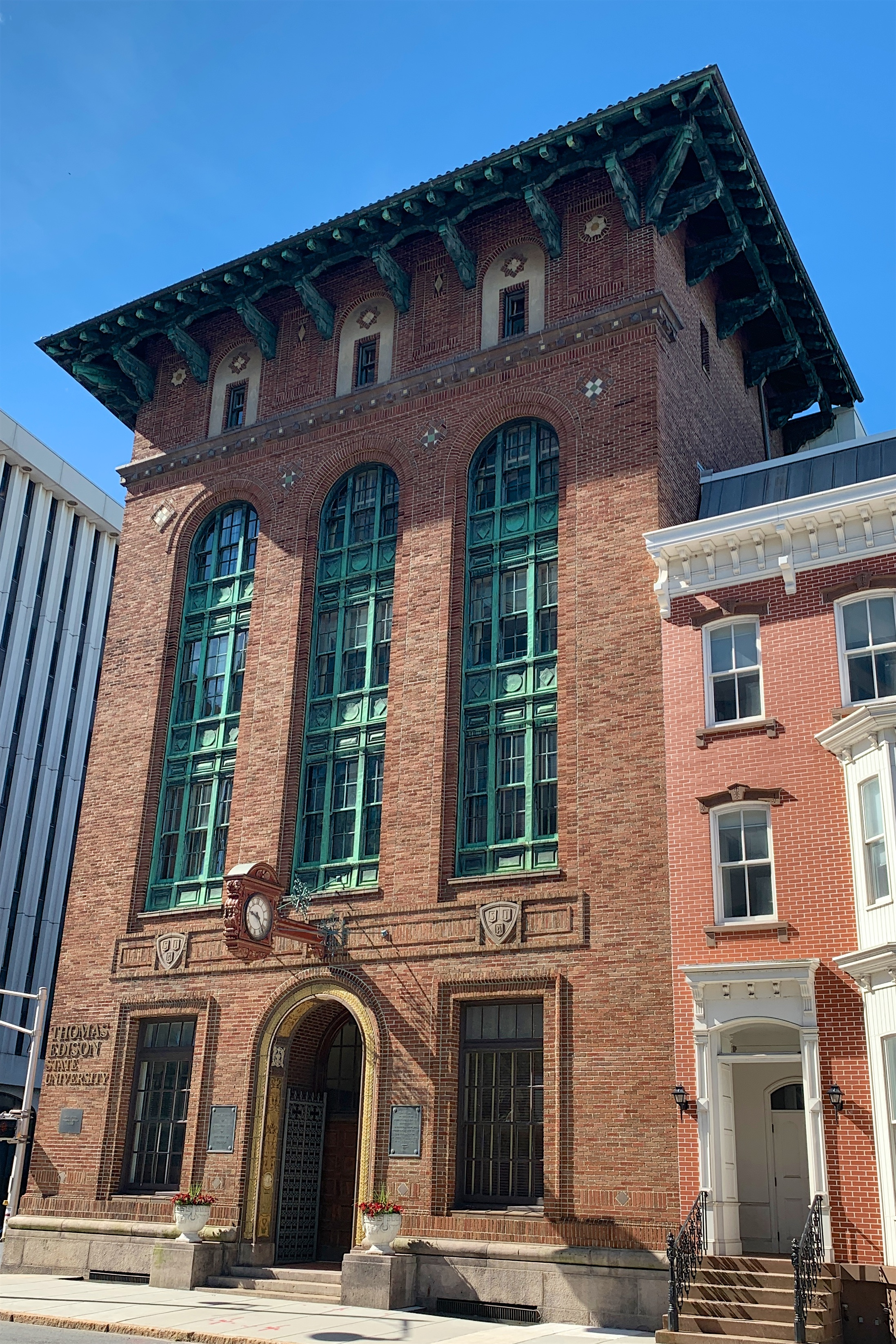
Kelsey Building (1911)

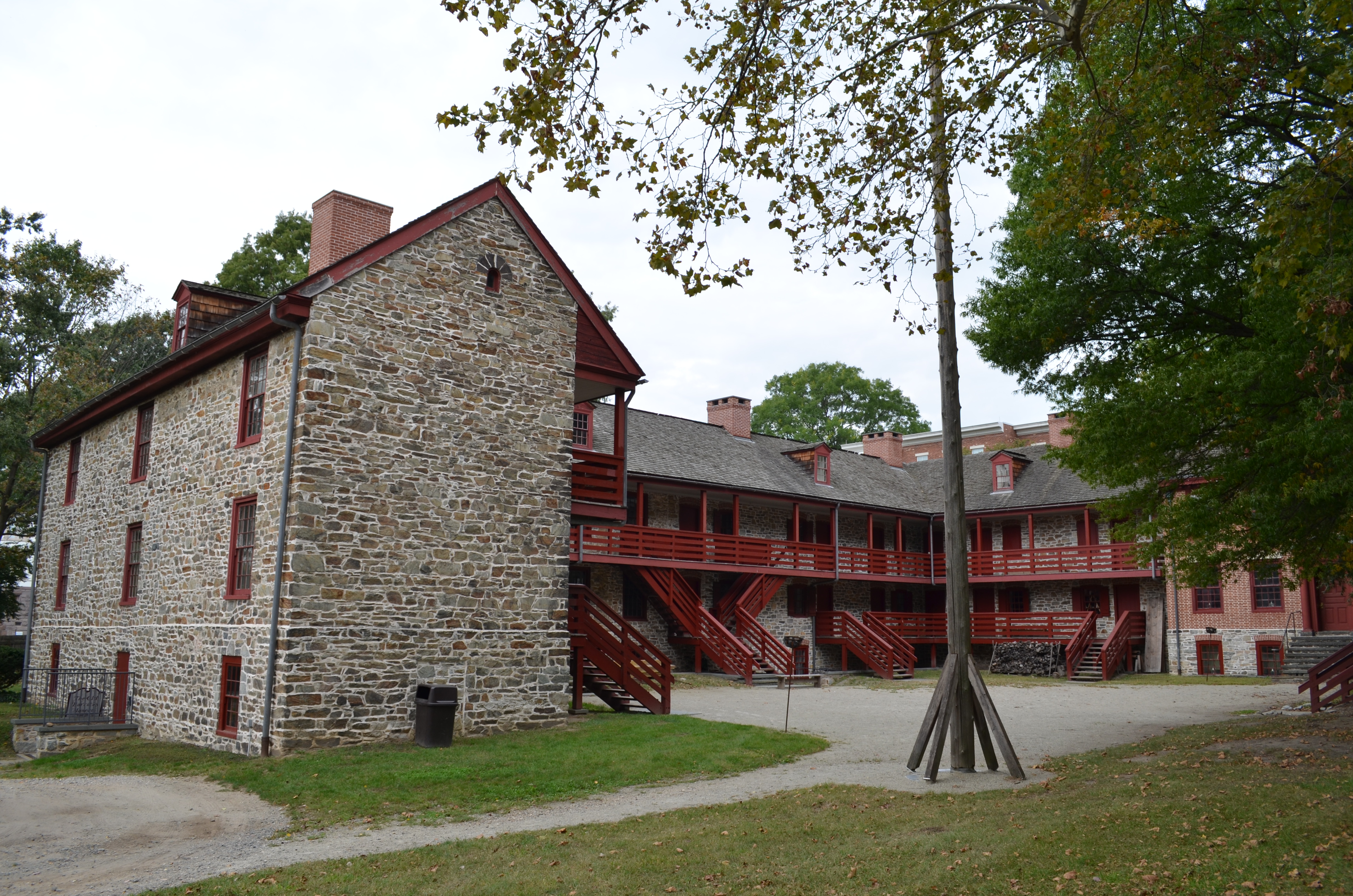
The Old Barracks Museum (1758)

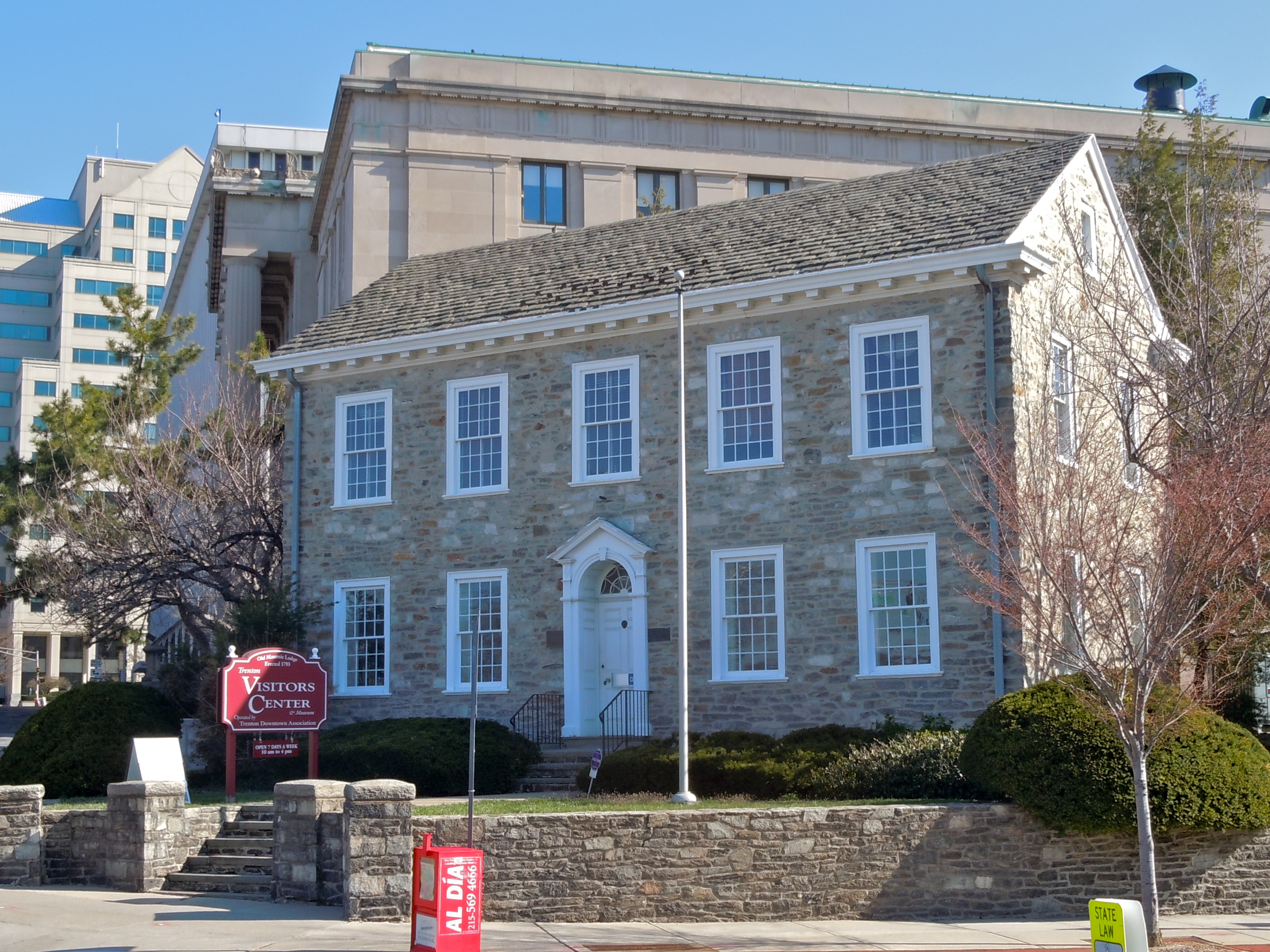
The Old Masonic Temple (1793)

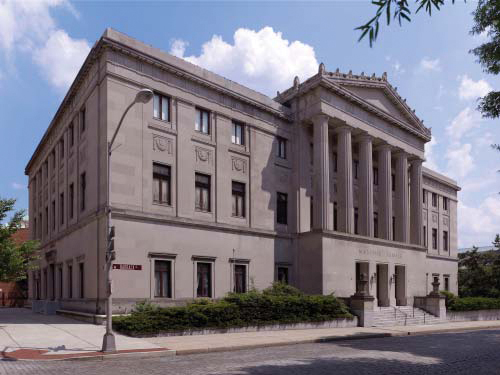
The New Masonic Temple (1927)

== See also ==
- National Register of Historic Places listings in Mercer County, New Jersey
