= St. Paul's Evangelical Lutheran Church & Parsonage =

Historic church in Minnesota, United States

- U.S. National Register of Historic Places
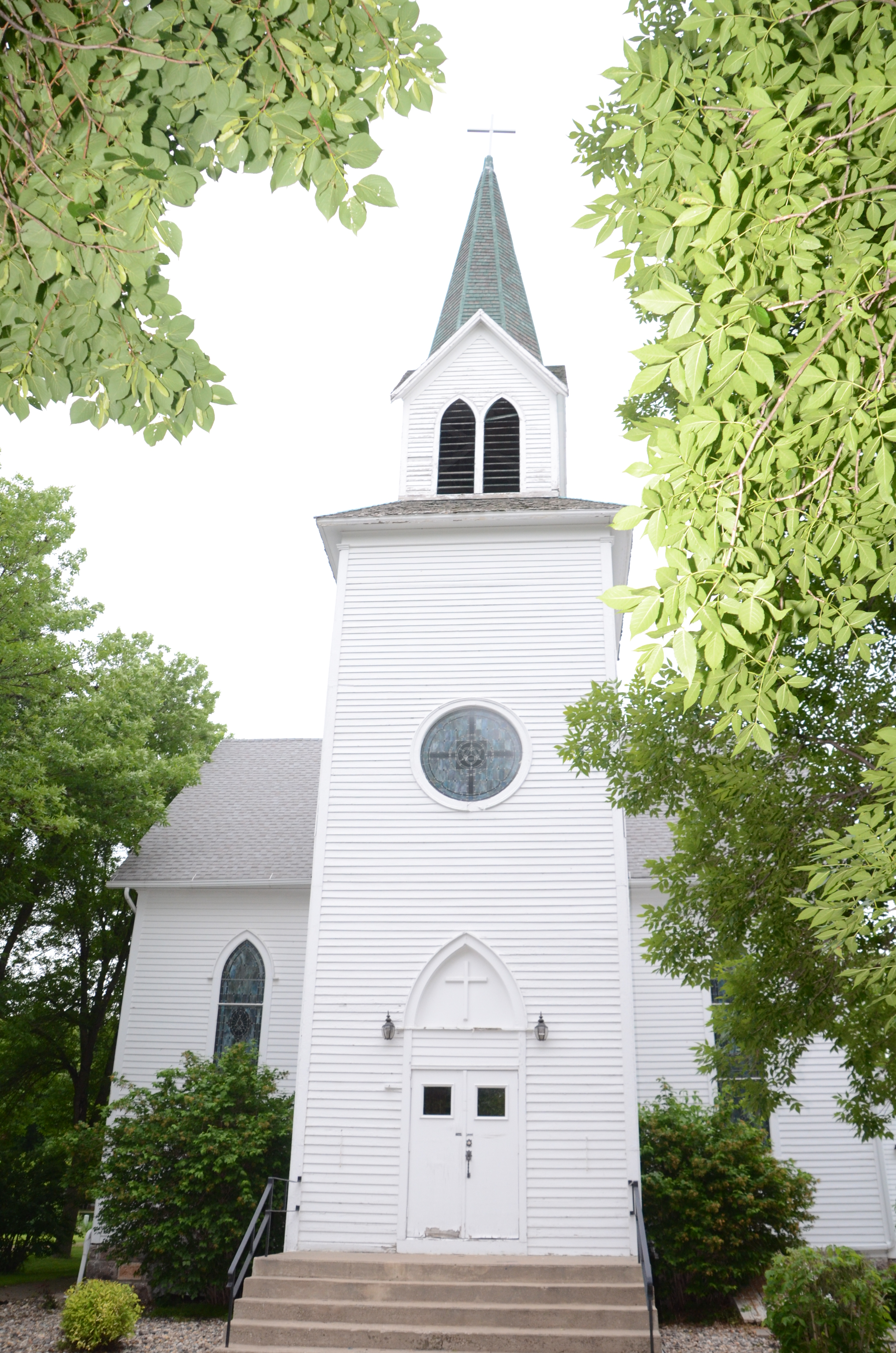

- Location within Minnesota Location within the United States
- Location: 412—414 E. Lyon St., Minneota, Minnesota
- Coordinates: 44°33′30″N 95°58′56″W
- Area: less than one acre
- Built: 1895
- MPS: Lyon County MRA
- NRHP reference No.: 82002986
- Added to NRHP: March 15, 1982

St. Paul's Evangelical Lutheran Church & Parsonage is a historic church at 412–414 East Lyon Street in Minneota, Minnesota, United States. It was built in 1891 by Icelandic immigrants and was added to the National Register of Historic Places in 1982.

The church serves the second-largest Icelandic community in the United States. Immigrants from Iceland began arriving in the area in 1875, and eventually around 800 Icelanders had settled in Lyon County, Lincoln County, and Yellow Medicine County. The immigrants were characterized by a culture of interest in public affairs and a traditional love of learning. They established schools, churches, libraries, reading clubs, and the only Icelandic language periodical in the United States. The congregation in Minnesota was organized by pastor Niels Steingrimur Thorkalsson, who arrived in 1887, but it took until 1895 before a building committee was formed. Ground was broken that fall and the church was completed in December 1895.

The church is an excellent example of Carpenter Gothic church architecture in Minnesota. It is built of wood frame construction with lap siding on a limestone foundation. The entrance is at the base of a three-story bell tower topped by an octagonal steeple. The interior has a Gothic altar and a semicircular communion rail.

It was added to the National Register of Historic Places in 1982.
