= Blaise Andries =

American football player (born 1998)

Profile
- Position: Guard

Personal information
- Born: July 21, 1998 (age 28); Marshall, Minnesota, U.S.
- Listed height: 6 ft 6 in (1.98 m)
- Listed weight: 335 lb (152 kg)

Career information
- High school: Marshall Senior
- College: Minnesota (2017–2021)
- NFL draft: 2022: undrafted

Career history
- Miami Dolphins (2022)*
- * Offseason or practice squad member only

Awards and highlights
- 3× Third-team All-Big Ten (2019–2021)
- Stats at Pro Football Reference

Blaise Andries (born July 21, 1998) is an American former football guard. He played college football for the Minnesota Golden Gophers.

== Early life ==
Andries was born on July 21, 1998, in Marshall, Minnesota, and attended Marshall Senior High School. Andries committed to play college football for the Minnesota Golden Gophers, under coach P. J. Fleck.

== College career ==
Andries played college football for the Minnesota Golden Gophers for four years, from 2017 to 2021, being redshirted in his first season, and he started in all 46 games. Andries started at all offensive line positions except center, playing five games at left tackle, nine at right tackle, eleven at left guard, and 21 at right guard. He was a redshirt senior and declared for the NFL Draft on December 19, 2021. Andries played his last college game in the 2021 Guaranteed Rate Bowl.

== Professional career ==
Pre-draft measurables
Height	Weight	Arm length	Hand span	Wingspan	40-yard dash	10-yard split	20-yard split	20-yard shuttle	Three-cone drill	Vertical jump	Broad jump	Bench press
6 ft 6 1/4 in (1.99 m)	308 lb (140 kg)	33 7/8 in (0.86 m)	9 7/8 in (0.25 m)	6 ft 8 1/8 in (2.04 m)	5.10 s	1.79 s	2.92 s	4.68 s	7.84 s	30.5 in (0.77 m)	8 ft 10 in (2.69 m)	28 reps
All values from NFL Combine

He was signed by the Miami Dolphins as an undrafted free agent after the 2022 NFL draft. He was waived on August 29, 2022.

== Personal life ==
Andries is the son of Joe and Helen Andries. He has one brother, Brent, and two sisters, Paige and Brooke.
