= Yahya Black =

American football player (born 2002)

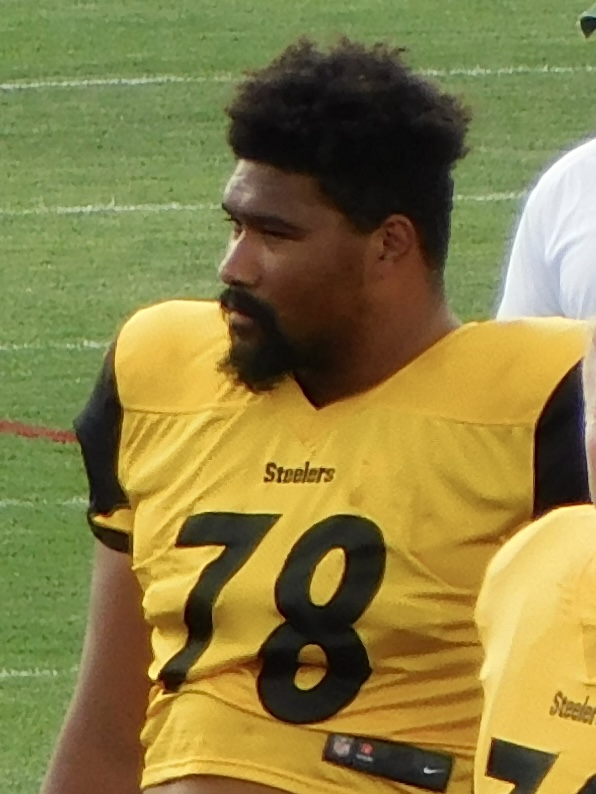
- Black with the Pittsburgh Steelers in 2025

No. 94 – Pittsburgh Steelers
- Position: Defensive tackle
- Roster status: Active

Personal information
- Born: April 21, 2002 (age 24); Marshall, Minnesota, U.S.
- Listed height: 6 ft 6 in (1.98 m)
- Listed weight: 330 lb (150 kg)

Career information
- High school: Marshall (MN)
- College: Iowa (2020–2024)
- NFL draft: 2025: 5th round, 164th overall pick

Career history
- Pittsburgh Steelers (2025–present)

Career NFL statistics as of Week 7, 2026
- Tackles: 44
- Sacks: 1
- Forced fumbles: 2
- Pass deflections: 2
- Fumble recoveries: 1
- Stats at Pro Football Reference

Yahya Black (WHY-yay; born April 21, 2002) is an American professional football defensive tackle for the Pittsburgh Steelers of the National Football League (NFL). He played college football for the Iowa Hawkeyes and was selected by the Steelers in the fifth round of the 2025 NFL draft.

== Early life ==
Black was born on April 21, 2002 in Marshall, Minnesota. He attended Marshall High School and was rated as a three-star recruit and commit to play college football for the Iowa Hawkeyes.

== College career ==
As a freshman, Black notched three tackles with half a tackle loss. In week 4 of the 2021 season, he forced a fumble in a win over Colorado State. In the 2021 season, Black totaled 18 tackles, two pass deflection, and a forced fumble. He finished the 2022 season with 11 tackles with one and a half being for a loss, a sack, and two pass deflections. In week 7 of the 2023 season, Black notched four tackles, a sack, a forced fumble, and a safety, in a win over Wisconsin. That season, he started all 14 games for the Hawkeyes and tallied 51 tackles with five being for a loss, three and a half sacks, and five pass deflections.

== Professional career ==
Pre-draft measurables
Height	Weight	Arm length	Hand span	Wingspan	40-yard dash	10-yard split	20-yard split	20-yard shuttle	Three-cone drill	Vertical jump	Broad jump
6 ft 5 3/4 in (1.97 m)	336 lb (152 kg)	35 in (0.89 m)	10 1/4 in (0.26 m)	6 ft 11 7/8 in (2.13 m)	5.39 s	1.88 s	3.12 s	4.58 s	7.58 s	25.5 in (0.65 m)	8 ft 5 in (2.57 m)
All values from NFL Combine/Pro Day

Black was selected by the Pittsburgh Steelers in the fifth round, as the 164th overall pick in the 2025 NFL draft.

== NFL career statistics ==
=== Regular season ===
Year	Team	Games		Tackles					Interceptions						Fumbles				
Year	Team	GP	GS	Cmb	Solo	Ast	Sck	TFL	Int	Yds	Avg	Lng	TD	PD	FF	Fmb	FR	Yds	TD
2025	PIT	17	3	28	10	18	0.0	0	0	0	0.0	0	0	1	2	0	1	0	0
2026	PIT	7	2	16	7	9	1.0	3	0	0	0.0	0	0	1	0	0	0	0	0
Career		24	5	44	17	27	1.0	3	0	0	0.0	0	0	2	2	0	1	0	0

=== Postseason ===
Year	Team	Games		Tackles					Interceptions						Fumbles				
Year	Team	GP	GS	Cmb	Solo	Ast	Sck	TFL	Int	Yds	Avg	Lng	TD	PD	FF	Fmb	FR	Yds	TD
2025	PIT	1	0	2	0	2	0.0	0	0	0	0.0	0	0	0	0	0	1	0	0
Career		1	0	2	0	2	0.0	0	0	0	0.0	0	0	0	0	0	1	0	0

== Personal life ==
In April 2026, Black married his wife, Hailiy Okins.
