= Casper Fischer =

American politician (1929–2022)

Member of the Minnesota House of Representatives from the 20th district
- In office 1963–1966
- In office 1967–1972

Personal details
- Born: March 5, 1929 Marshall, Minnesota, U.S.
- Died: August 6, 2022 (aged 93) Marshall, Minnesota, U.S.
- Party: Conservative Caucus
- Occupation: Farmer/Beef Cattle Feeder

William Casper "Cap" Fischer (March 5, 1929 – August 6, 2022) was an American politician in the state of Minnesota. He served in the Minnesota House of Representatives from 1963 to 1966 and 1967 to 1972.
