= John B. Gislason =

American politician

John Bjorn "J.B." Gislason (December 6, 1872 – December 4, 1960) was an American farmer and politician.

He was born in Iceland and emigrated with his parents to the United States in 1879 and settled in Lyon County, Minnesota. He eventually lived in Minneota, Minnesota, and was a farmer. Gislason served as the township clerk for Westerheim Township, Lyon County, Minnesota. He also served on the school board and was the school board clerk. Gislason was involved with the Southern Minnesota Betterment Development League and the Lyon County Agricultural Association. Gislason served in the Minnesota House of Representatives from 1919 to 1926.

Gislason died on December 4, 1960, aged 87.
