= Gordon Forbes (politician) =

Minnesota politician

Gordon Forbes (August 4, 1920 – June 9, 2003) was an American lawyer and politician.

Forbes was born in Marshall, Lyon County, Minnesota and graduated from Marshall High School. He served in the United States Army during World War II. Forbes graduated from the University of Minnesota in 1942 and from the University of Minnesota Law School in 1949. He lived in Worthington, Nobles County, Minnesota with his wife and family and practiced law there. Forbes served in the Minnesota House of Representatives from 1951 to 1954. Forbes was a lobbyist for the railroads business. He died in Little Canada, Minnesota.
