= Bridge No. 5151-Marshall =

- Bridge No. 5151-Marshall, MN
- U.S. National Register of Historic Places
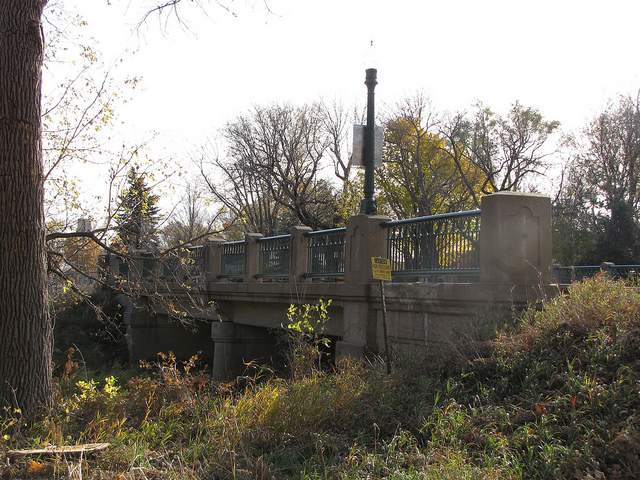

- Location within Minnesota Location within the United States
- Location: Bridge No. 5151-Marshall, Marshall, Minnesota
- Coordinates: 44°26′35″N 95°47′59″W
- Area: less than one acre
- Built: 1931
- Architect: Guaranty Construction Co., Minnesota Highway Dept.
- Architectural style: Bridge; Concrete girder
- NRHP reference No.: 98000683
- Added to NRHP: June 29, 1998

Bridge No. 5151-Marshall is a concrete girder bridge with decorative metal lampposts, carrying Minnesota State Highway 19 over the Redwood River in Marshall, Minnesota, United States. It was built 1931 and was listed on the National Register of Historic Places in 1998. Along with the nearby Bridge No. 5083-Marshall, it was nominated as a rare surviving example of the ornamental urban highway bridges built in Minnesota before World War II.
