= Old Barracks Museum =

Building in Trenton, New Jersey

- Old Barracks
- U.S. National Register of Historic Places
- U.S. National Historic Landmark
- U.S. Historic district – Contributing property
- New Jersey Register of Historic Places
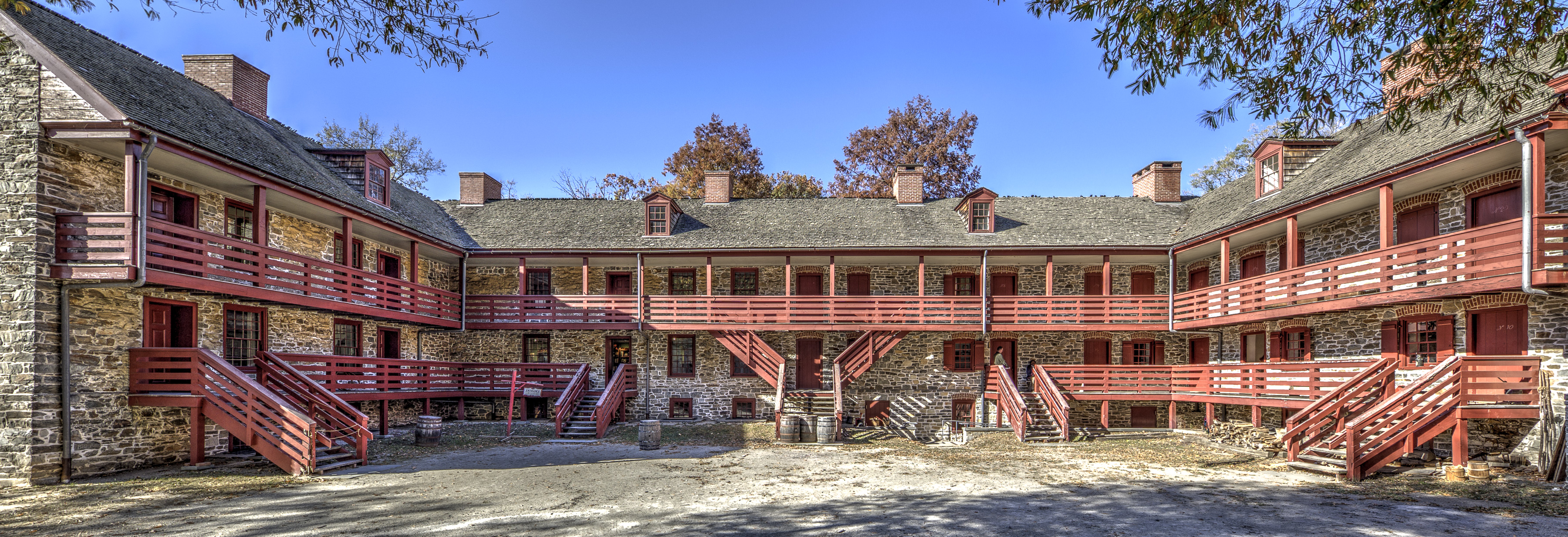
- Old Barracks in 2024

- Location within Mercer County, New Jersey Location within New Jersey Location within the United States
- Location: 101 Barrack Street, Trenton, New Jersey
- Coordinates: 40°13′11″N 74°46′7″W
- Area: 1 acre (0.40 ha)
- Built: 1758
- Architectural style: Georgian
- Part of: State House Historic District (ID76001161)
- NRHP reference No.: 71000506
- NJRHP No.: 1784

Significant dates
- Added to NRHP: January 25, 1971
- Designated NHL: November 28, 1972
- Designated NJRHP: September 11, 1970

The Old Barracks Museum, also known just as the Old Barracks, is a historic building located at 101 Barracks Street in Trenton, Mercer County, New Jersey. Built in 1758 to house soldiers of the British Army, it is the only remaining colonial barracks in the state and is one of the few tangible surviving elements of the 1776 Battle of Trenton. The building was added to the National Register of Historic Places on January 25, 1971 and listed as a National Historic Landmark on November 28, 1972, for its significance in military history. It is now a state-run historic site and museum.

== History ==
The Old Barracks were built in 1758 to house British soldiers during the French and Indian War, after colonists complained about the forced quartering of soldiers engaged in the conflict. It was built as a U-shaped stone structure, capable of housing about 300 soldiers at a time. It was reoccupied as a winter quarters by Hessian troops in the fall of 1776, during the American Revolutionary War. George Washington crossed the Delaware River to catch the Hessian garrison by surprise during the Battle of Trenton on the morning of December 26, 1776. Most of this battlefield is now occupied by downtown Trenton. For the remainder of that conflict it was occupied by whichever force controlled Trenton, including at various times British and American Continental Army troops. In the later stages of the war it was used as a military hospital by the Continental Army.

Following the Revolution, the building was sold off, and it was converted into a series of private residences. One arm of the barracks was demolished in 1813 to make way for Front Street. From 1855 to 1899 it was used as a home for elderly women. In 1902, members of the Daughters of the Revolution, under the leadership of Beulah A. Oliphant, bought part of the building to preserve it. The state bought the other part and formed a museum in 1914 which continues to be open and supported by the State of New Jersey.

The museum is open to visitors year round, Monday–Saturday, and is known for the annual Battle of Trenton Reenactments.

== Gallery ==
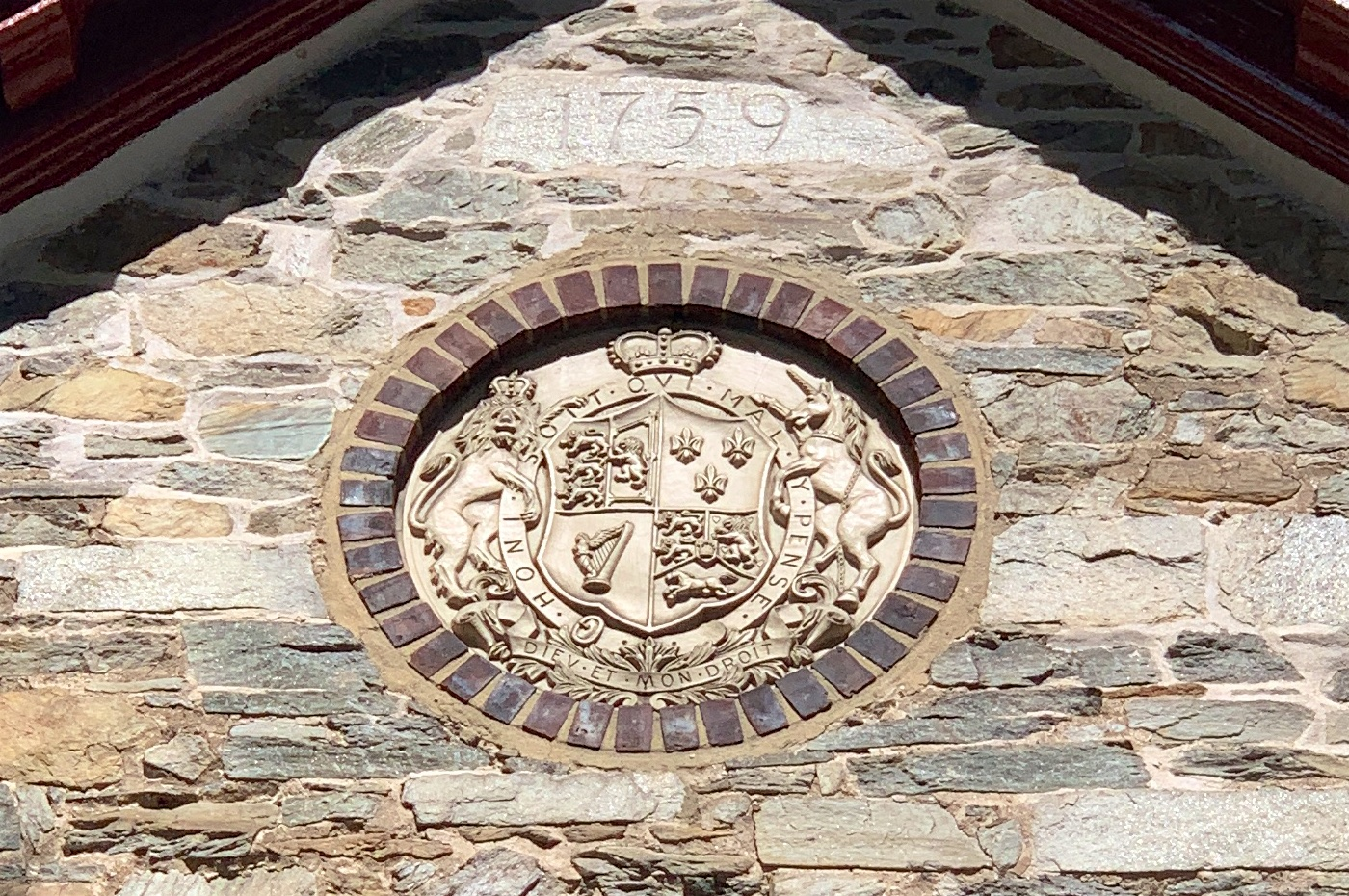
Building date, 1759, and royal coat-of-arms of King George II of Great Britain

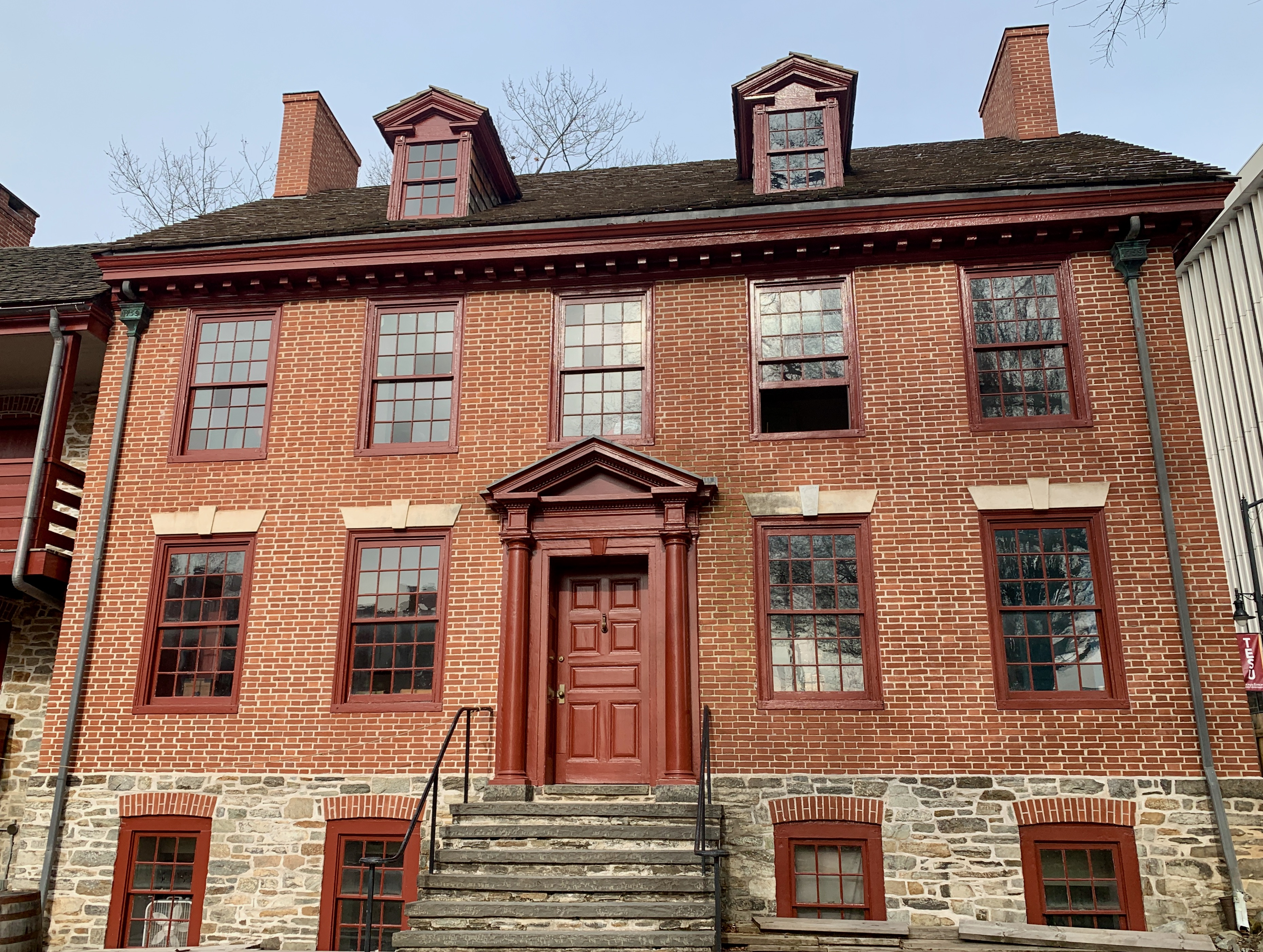
Officers' House

== See also ==
- National Register of Historic Places listings in Mercer County, New Jersey
- East Jersey Olde Towne Village, site of replica of New Brunswick Barracks
