= Bill Holm (poet) =

American writer

- Born: August 25, 1943; Minneota, Minnesota, U.S.
- Died: February 25, 2009 (aged 65); Sioux Falls, South Dakota, U.S.
- Education: Gustavus Adolphus College; University of Kansas
- Occupations: Poet, essayist, memoirist, musician
- Writing career
- Notable works: The Music of Failure; The Heart Can Be Filled Anywhere on Earth
- Notable awards: Bush Foundation Arts Fellow (1982); National Endowment for the Arts Fellow (1987); Minnesota Book Awards (1991); Sue M. Cobb Award for Exemplary Diplomatic Service (2003); McKnight Distinguished Artist (2008)

Bill Holm (August 25, 1943 – February 25, 2009) was an American poet, essayist, memoirist, and musician. He was a frequent guest on A Prairie Home Companion.

== Biography ==
Holm was born on a farm north of Minneota, Minnesota in 1943 and attended Gustavus Adolphus College in St. Peter, Minnesota where he graduated in 1965. Later, he attended the University of Kansas. He was Professor of English at Southwest Minnesota State University, where he taught classes on poetry and literature until his retirement in 2007.

Holm was named the McKnight Distinguished Artist of the Year in 2008. This award celebrates artists who have left a significant imprint on the culture of Minnesota. Holm was named a Bush Foundation Arts Fellow in 1982 and 1995 and a National Endowment for the Arts Fellow in 1987. He received Minnesota Book Awards in 1991 and 1997. For his service to Iceland, he earned the Sue M. Cobb Award for Exemplary Diplomatic Service in 2003. In 1991, Gustavus Adolphus College awarded Holm a Distinguished Alumni Citation and in 2002 he received an honorary doctorate.

He was the grandson of Icelandic immigrants and spent part of every year at his second home in Hofsós, Iceland. Holm died February 25, 2009, in Sioux Falls, South Dakota at 65 years, of complications of pneumonia.

== Books ==
Holm is the author of twelve books of poems and essays:

- Boxelder Bug Variations: A Meditation on an Idea in Language and Music, 1985 ISBN 0-915943-43-3
- The Music of Failure, 1986
- Coming Home Crazy: An Alphabet of China Essays, 1990 ISBN 978-0-915943-42-5
- The Dead Get By with Everything, 1991 ISBN 0-915943-55-7
- Chocolate Chip Cookies For Your Enemies, 1993
- Landscape of Ghosts, 1993
- The Heart Can Be Filled Anywhere on Earth, 1996 ISBN 978-1-57131-209-9
- Playing Haydn for the Angel of Death, 1997
- Faces of Christmas Past, 1998
- Eccentric Islands, 2000 ISBN 1-57131-245-5
- Playing the Black Piano, 2004 ISBN 1-57131-417-2
- Windows of Brimnes: An American in Iceland, 2007 ISBN 1-57131-302-8

== Audio books ==
Holm has published 4 audio books of poems and essays on CD:

- Holmward Bound - An Evening With Bill Holm, (EssayAudio.com, 2001, ISBN 0-9665212-5-0)
- Faces of Christmas Past, (EssayAudio.com, 2002, ISBN 0-9665212-6-9)
- Notes From the Black Piano, (EssayAudio.com, 2004, ISBN 0-9665212-0-X)
- There Is No Other Way to Speak – Voices, (EssayAudio.com, 2005, ISBN 0-9665212-7-7)
