= Lynd, Minnesota =

City in Minnesota, United States

- City
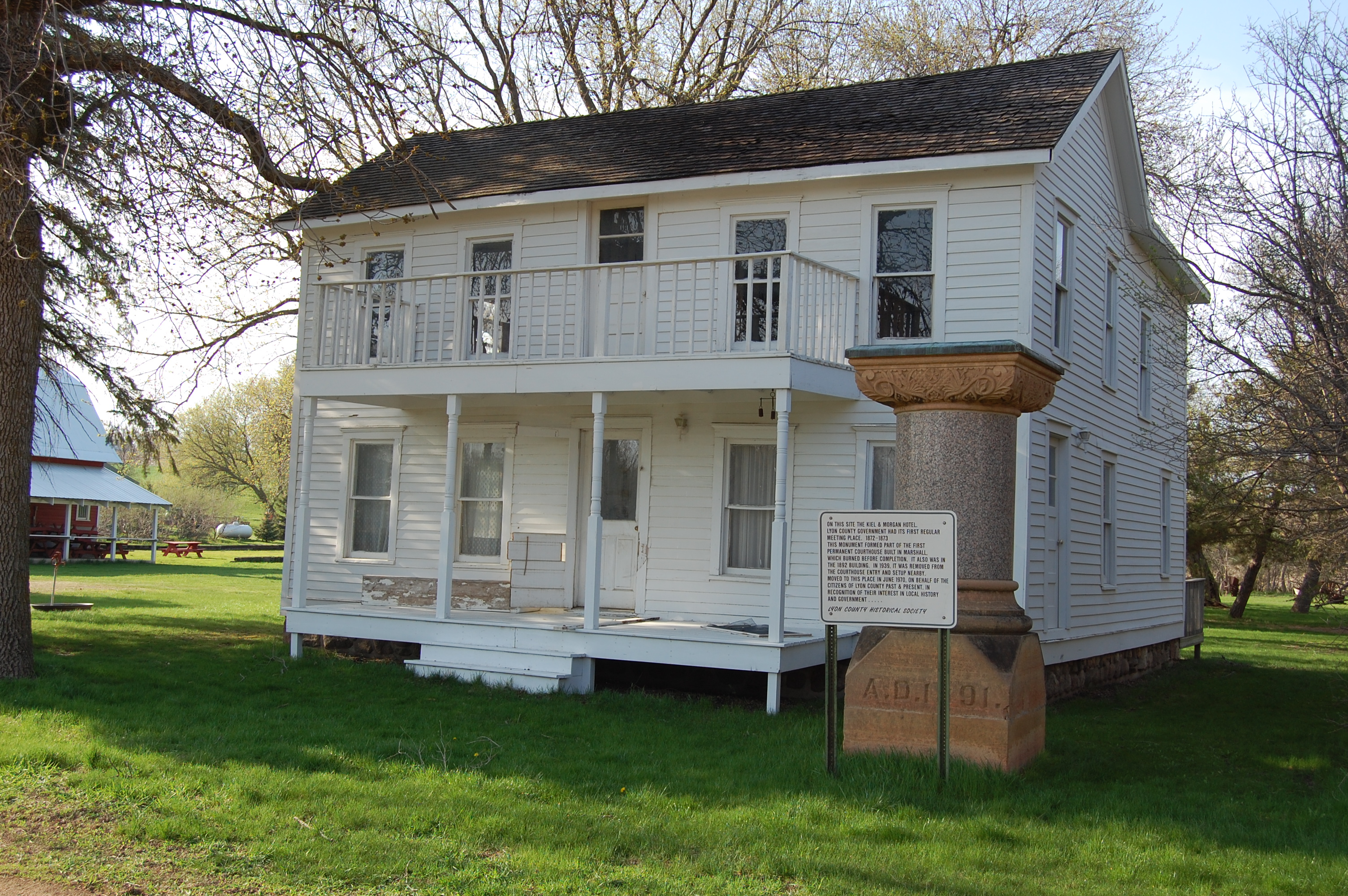
- Historic Kiel and Morgan Hotel, now a museum
- Nickname: Lindia
- Location of Lynd, Minnesota
- Coordinates: 44°23′49″N 95°52′53″W
- Country: United States
- State: Minnesota
- County: Lyon

Government
  - Type: Mayor – Council
  - Mayor: Justin Guggisburg

Area
  - Total: 1.17 sq mi (3.02 km^{2})
  - Land: 1.16 sq mi (3.00 km^{2})
  - Water: 0.0077 sq mi (0.02 km^{2})
- Elevation: 1,289 ft (393 m)

Population (2020)
  - Total: 436
  - Density: 376.9/sq mi (145.51/km^{2})
- Time zone: UTC-6 (Central (CST))
  - Summer (DST): UTC-5 (CDT)
- ZIP code: 56157
- Area code: 507
- FIPS code: 27-38708
- GNIS feature ID: 2395791
- Website: https://lyndcity.gov/

Lynd is a city in Lyon County, Minnesota, United States. The population was 436 at the 2020 census. Lynd is a small but growing community in southwestern Minnesota. The development of a new golf course and an additional housing development have started a growth trend that may eventually double the size of the community. It is primarily a bedroom community for individuals who work in the nearby city of Marshall. Despite being much smaller in size, it historically played a more significant role in the area. The Kiel and Morgan Hotel in the town was the original Lyon County seat.

== History ==
Lynd was platted in 1888. The city's namesake is state senator James Lynd, who was killed in the Attack at the Lower Sioux Agency.

== Geography ==
According to the United States Census Bureau, the city has a total area of 1.19 square miles (3.08 km^{2}), of which 1.17 square miles (3.03 km^{2}) is land and 0.02 square miles (0.05 km^{2}) is water.

The Redwood River flows through the city.

Minnesota State Highway 23 serves as a main route in the community.

== Demographics ==
Historical population
Census	Pop.	Note	%±
1960	259		—
1970	267		3.1%
1980	304		13.9%
1990	287		−5.6%
2000	346		20.6%
2010	448		29.5%
2020	436		−2.7%
U.S. Decennial Census

=== 2010 census ===
As of the census of 2010, there were 448 people, 164 households, and 119 families living in the city. The population density was 382.9 inhabitants per square mile (147.8/km^{2}). There were 184 housing units at an average density of 157.3 per square mile (60.7/km^{2}). The racial makeup of the city was 83.0% White, 2.0% African American, 0.9% Native American, 0.9% Asian, 10.5% from other races, and 2.7% from two or more races. Hispanic or Latino of any race were 19.0% of the population.

There were 164 households, of which 42.1% had children under the age of 18 living with them, 56.1% were married couples living together, 11.6% had a female householder with no husband present, 4.9% had a male householder with no wife present, and 27.4% were non-families. 23.2% of all households were made up of individuals, and 4.2% had someone living alone who was 65 years of age or older. The average household size was 2.73 and the average family size was 3.25.

The median age in the city was 34.2 years. 31.7% of residents were under the age of 18; 6.5% were between the ages of 18 and 24; 28.4% were from 25 to 44; 25.8% were from 45 to 64; and 7.6% were 65 years of age or older. The gender makeup of the city was 50.9% male and 49.1% female.

=== 2000 census ===
As of the census of 2000, there were 346 people, 130 households, and 80 families living in the city. The population density was 826.1 inhabitants per square mile (319.0/km^{2}). There were 134 housing units at an average density of 319.9 per square mile (123.5/km^{2}). The racial makeup of the city was 89.02% White, 0.58% African American, 0.29% Native American, 1.45% Asian, 6.36% from other races, and 2.31% from two or more races. Hispanic or Latino of any race were 14.16% of the population.

There were 130 households, out of which 33.8% had children under the age of 18 living with them, 50.0% were married couples living together, 6.2% had a female householder with no husband present, and 37.7% were non-families. 23.8% of all households were made up of individuals, and 9.2% had someone living alone who was 65 years of age or older. The average household size was 2.66 and the average family size was 3.20.

In the city, the population was spread out, with 27.2% under the age of 18, 12.7% from 18 to 24, 30.9% from 25 to 44, 18.5% from 45 to 64, and 10.7% who were 65 years of age or older. The median age was 33 years. For every 100 females, there were 119.0 males. For every 100 females age 18 and over, there were 119.1 males.

The median income for a household in the city was $36,125, and the median income for a family was $36,458. Males had a median income of $26,635 versus $20,313 for females. The per capita income for the city was $15,026. About 14.7% of families and 15.7% of the population were below the poverty line, including 23.9% of those under age 18 and none of those age 65 or over.
