= Kiel and Morgan Hotel =

- Kiel & Morgan Hotel/Lyon County Courthouse
- U.S. National Register of Historic Places
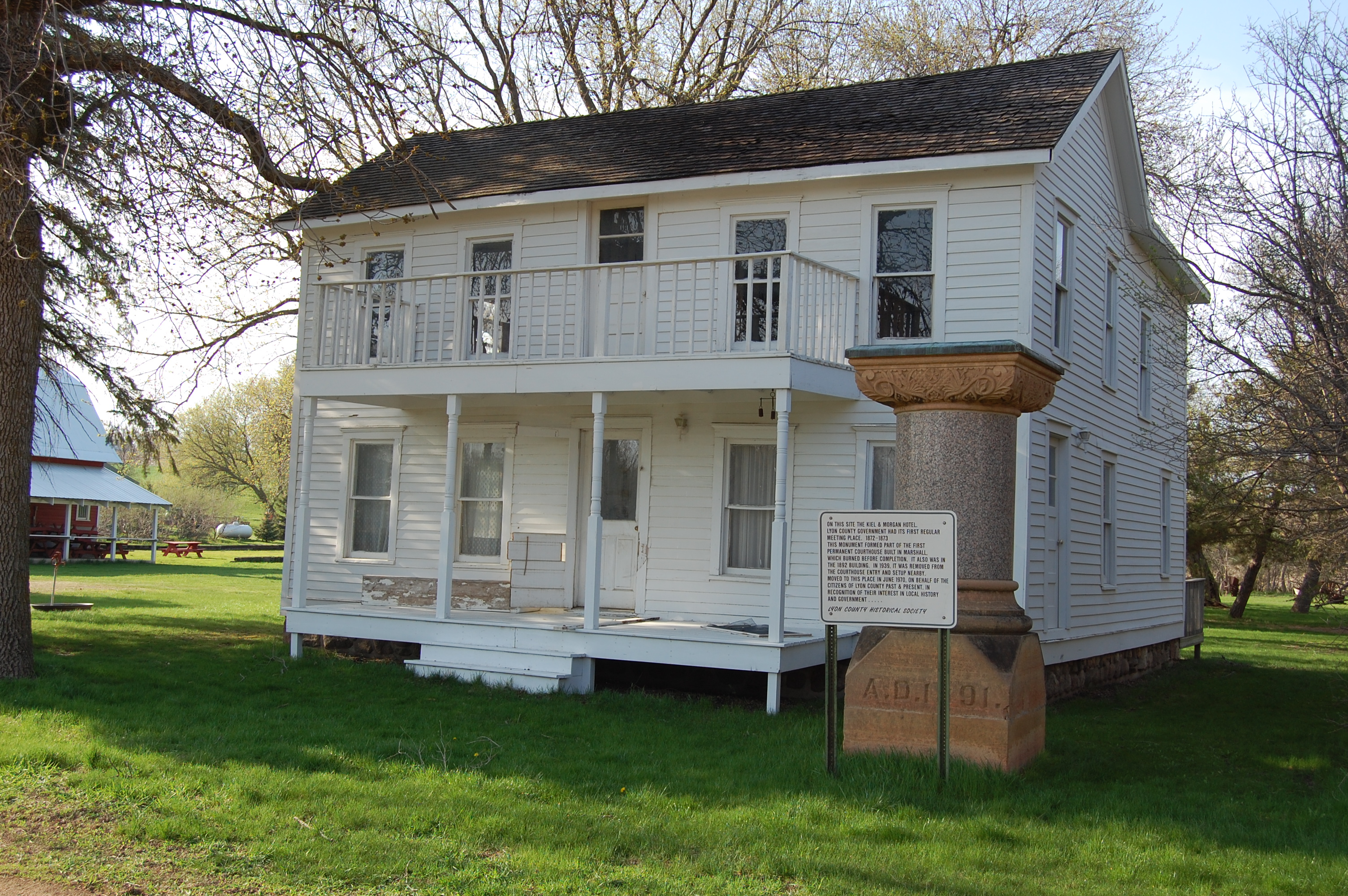
- Kiel and Morgan Hotel in 2011

- Location within Minnesota Location within the United States
- Nearest city: Lynd, Minnesota
- Coordinates: 44°23′36″N 95°53′30″W
- Area: less than one acre
- Built: 1871
- MPS: Lyon County MRA
- NRHP reference No.: 82002981
- Added to NRHP: March 15, 1982

The Kiel and Morgan Hotel in Lynd, Minnesota, United States, was the building first used on a regular basis as the Lyon County Courthouse. In 1869, the Minnesota Legislature passed an enabling act dividing Lyon County from Redwood County. Governor William R. Marshall appointed several officials authorized to form a county government. On August 12, 1870, the county commissioners held their first meeting in the home of Luman Ticknor in upper Lynd. The hotel was built in 1871 by Allen D. Morgan and Levi Kiel. Because of the small population in the area, the hotel served variously as the seat of county government, post office, store, and church.

The Kiel and Morgan Hotel is an important historical place because it is one of the few remaining examples of the type of buildings that were used for both private and government meeting places during the early settlement of the western Minnesota counties.

After the county government moved to Marshall, where it remains today, the hotel was used as a farm house. In 1990, the owner Eva Schrunk donated the property to the city of Lynd.

== Sources ==
Rose, A.P. History of Lyon County, Minnesota.
