= Old Masonic Temple (Marshall, Minnesota) =

- U.S. National Register of Historic Places
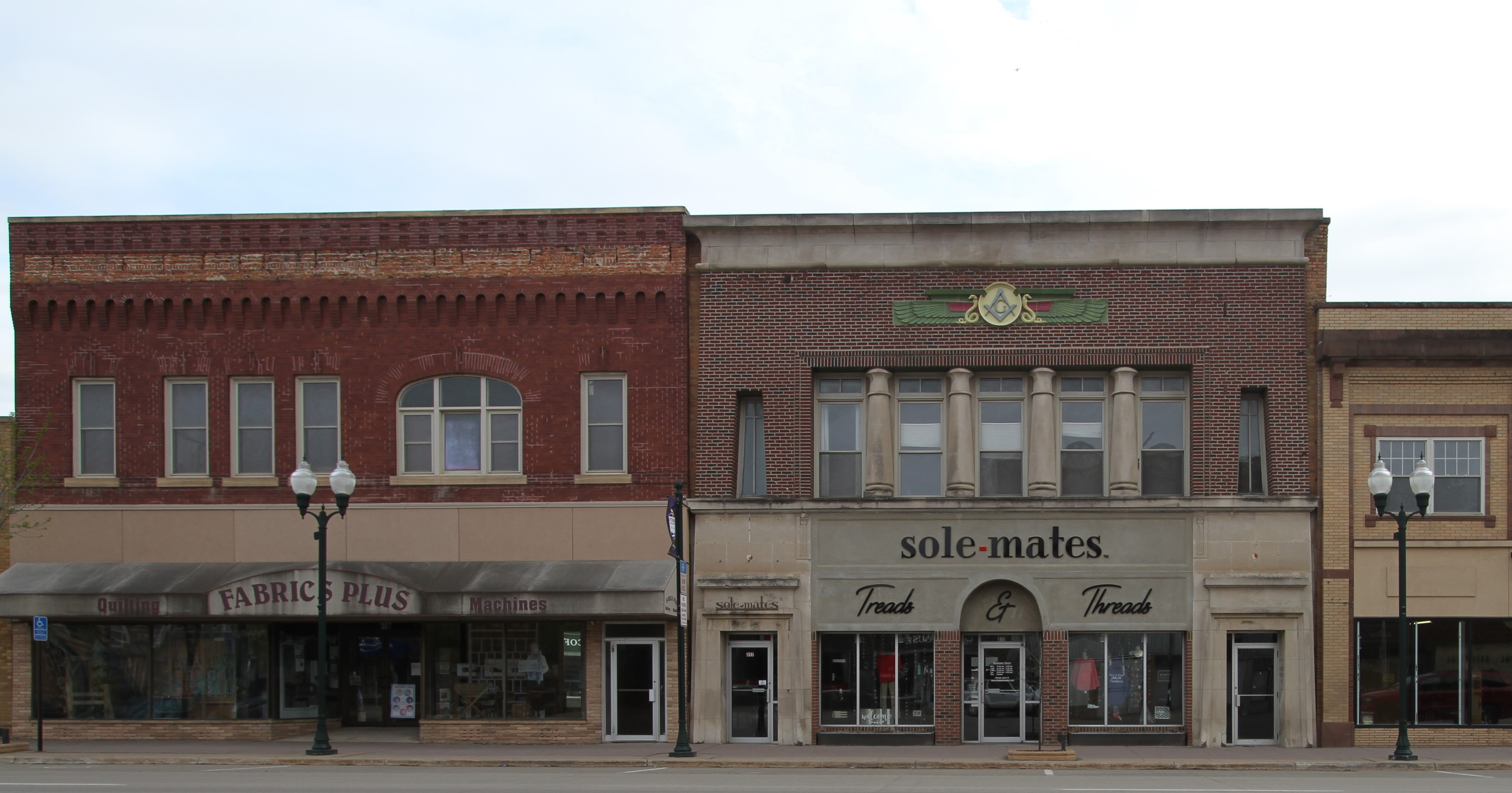

- Location within Minnesota Location within the United States
- Location: 325 West Main, Marshall, Minnesota
- Coordinates: 44°26′53″N 95°47′22″W
- Area: less than one acre
- Built: 1917
- Architect: Ellerbe, F.H.; Johnson, E.M.
- Architectural style: Exotic Revival, Second Egyptian Revival
- MPS: Lyon County MRA
- NRHP reference No.: 82002983
- Added to NRHP: March 15, 1982

The Old Masonic Temple is a historic building located in Marshall, Minnesota, United States. Built in 1917, the building was listed on the National Register of Historic Places in 1982 (under the name Masonic Temple Delta Lodge No. 119). It was nominated for being one of Minnesota's most complete examples of Egyptian Revival architecture. Delta Lodge No. 119 no longer meets in the building.
