= Bridge No. 5083-Marshall =

- Bridge No. 5083-Marshall, MN
- U.S. National Register of Historic Places
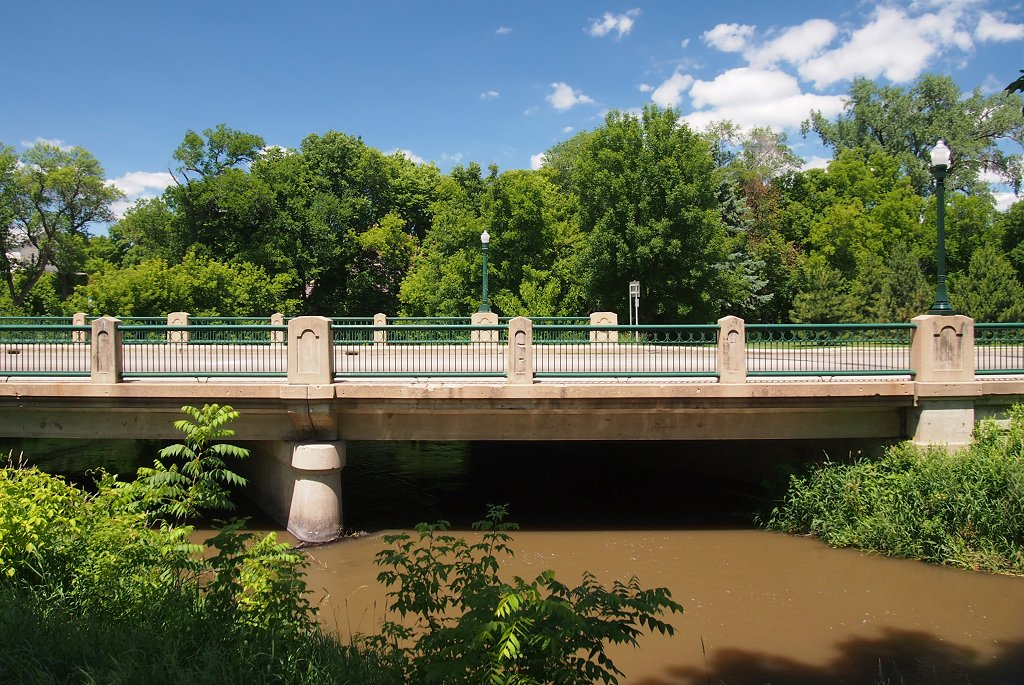
- Bridge No. 5083 from Liberty Park

- Location within Minnesota Location within the United States
- Location: Bridge No. 5083-Marshall, Marshall, Minnesota
- Coordinates: 44°26′58″N 95°47′07″W
- Area: less than one acre
- Built: 1931
- Architect: Guaranty Construction Co., Minnesota Highway Dept.
- Architectural style: Bridge; Concrete girder
- NRHP reference No.: 98000682
- Added to NRHP: June 29, 1998

Bridge No. 5083-Marshall carries Minnesota State Highway 19 over the Redwood River in Marshall, Minnesota, United States. It was built 1931 and is one of two bridges on the historic register in the city. It was listed on the National Register of Historic Places in 1998.

Bridge No. 5083 was completed at a cost of $23,277 in October 1931. This bridge is between a residential neighborhood on the south and the city's main park on the north. The bridge design is two 37-foot (11 m) concrete-girder spans on a concrete substructure. Eight lines of girders support the concrete deck, which accommodates a 40-foot (12 m), bituminous-surfaced roadway and two concrete sidewalks bordered by ornamental, open-balustrade, metal railings with concrete posts. Each railing supports two metal light standards detailed in the Classical Revival Style.

Along with the nearby Bridge No. 5151-Marshall, it was nominated for being a rare surviving example of the ornamental urban highway bridges built in Minnesota before World War II.
