= Taunton, Minnesota =

City in Minnesota, United States

- City
- Location of Taunton, Minnesota
- Coordinates: 44°35′40″N 96°3′50″W
- Country: United States
- State: Minnesota
- County: Lyon

Government
  - Type: Mayor – Council
  - Mayor: Mike Breyfogle

Area
  - Total: 1.01 sq mi (2.61 km^{2})
  - Land: 1.01 sq mi (2.61 km^{2})
  - Water: 0 sq mi (0.00 km^{2})
- Elevation: 1,171 ft (357 m)

Population (2020)
  - Total: 136
  - Density: 135.1/sq mi (52.15/km^{2})
- Time zone: UTC-6 (Central (CST))
  - Summer (DST): UTC-5 (CDT)
- ZIP code: 56291
- Area code: 507
- FIPS code: 27-64264
- GNIS feature ID: 2396033

Taunton is a city in Lyon County, Minnesota, United States. As of the 2020 census, Taunton had a population of 136.

== History ==
Taunton was platted in 1886 by the railroad. It was named after Taunton, Massachusetts. A post office has been in operation in Taunton since 1888. Taunton was incorporated in 1900.

== Geography ==
According to the United States Census Bureau, the city has a total area of 1.01 square miles (2.62 km^{2}), all land.

== Demographics ==
Historical population
| Census | Pop. | Note | %± |
|---|---|---|---|
| 1910 | 205 | | — |
| 1920 | 183 | | −10.7% |
| 1930 | 211 | | 15.3% |
| 1940 | 207 | | −1.9% |
| 1950 | 217 | | 4.8% |
| 1960 | 233 | | 7.4% |
| 1970 | 195 | | −16.3% |
| 1980 | 177 | | −9.2% |
| 1990 | 175 | | −1.1% |
| 2000 | 207 | | 18.3% |
| 2010 | 139 | | −32.9% |
| 2020 | 136 | | −2.2% |
U.S. Decennial Census

=== 2010 census ===
As of the census of 2010, there were 139 people, 68 households, and 35 families residing in the city. The population density was 137.6 inhabitants per square mile (53.1/km^{2}). There were 78 housing units at an average density of 77.2 units per square mile (29.8 units/km^{2}). The racial makeup of the city was 100.0% White.

There were 68 households, of which 23.5% had children under the age of 18 living with them, 39.7% were married couples living together, 8.8% had a female householder with no husband present, 2.9% had a male householder with no wife present, and 48.5% were non-families. 38.2% of all households were made up of individuals, and 13.2% had someone living alone who was 65 years of age or older. The average household size was 2.04 and the average family size was 2.71.

The median age in the city was 42.2 years. 23.7% of residents were under the age of 18; 5.1% were between the ages of 18 and 24; 25.2% were from 25 to 44; 28.1% were from 45 to 64; and 18% were 65 years of age or older. The gender makeup of the city was 45.3% male and 54.7% female.

=== 2000 census ===
As of the census of 2000, there were 207 people, 72 households, and 39 families residing in the city. The population density was 206.5 inhabitants per square mile (79.7/km^{2}). There were 77 housing units at an average density of 76.8 units per square mile (29.7 units/km^{2}). The racial makeup of the city was 98.55% White, 0.48% Asian, and 0.97% from two or more races.

There were 72 households, out of which 23.6% had children under the age of 18 living with them, 47.2% were married couples living together, 5.6% had a female householder with no husband present, and 45.8% were non-families. 37.5% of all households were made up of individuals, and 22.2% had someone living alone who was 65 years of age or older. The average household size was 2.24 and the average family size was 3.00.

In the city, the population was spread out, with 19.8% under the age of 18, 4.3% from 18 to 24, 20.8% from 25 to 44, 13.5% from 45 to 64, and 41.5% who were 65 years of age or older. The median age was 50 years. For every 100 females, there were 86.5 males. For every 100 females age 18 and over, there were 88.6 males.

The median income for a household in the city was $23,125, and the median income for a family was $38,125. Males had a median income of $22,500 versus $20,893 for females. The per capita income for the city was $14,658. About 18.5% of families and 25.0% of the population were below the poverty line, including 43.3% of those under the age of eighteen and 23.1% of those 65 or over.

== See also ==
- Taunton, England
- Taunton, Massachusetts
