= Minneota, Minnesota =

City in Minnesota, United States

Minneota
- City
- Nickname: Ota
- Location of Minneota, Minnesota
- Coordinates: 44°33′45″N 95°58′58″W
- Country: United States
- State: Minnesota
- County: Lyon
- Platted: 1881
- Incorporated: January 21, 1881

Government
  - Type: Mayor – Council
  - Mayor: John Rolbiecki

Area
  - Total: 1.45 sq mi (3.76 km^{2})
  - Land: 1.45 sq mi (3.76 km^{2})
  - Water: 0 sq mi (0.00 km^{2})
- Elevation: 1,165 ft (355 m)

Population (2020)
  - Total: 1,366
  - Estimate (2022): 1,355
  - Density: 941.1/sq mi (363.36/km^{2})
- Time zone: UTC−6 (Central (CST))
  - Summer (DST): UTC−5 (CDT)
- ZIP Code: 56264
- Area code: 507
- FIPS code: 27-43126
- GNIS feature ID: 2395348
- Sales tax: 6.875%
- Website: minneota.com

Minneota is a city in Lyon County, Minnesota, United States. The population was 1,366 at the 2020 census.

== History ==
Minneota was platted in 1881 when the railroad was extended to its location. The name Minneota is derived from the Dakota language meaning "much water".

== Geography ==
According to the United States Census Bureau, the city has a total area of 1.43 square miles (3.70 km^{2}), all land. The South Branch of the Yellow Medicine River flows through the city.

== Demographics ==
Historical population
Census	Pop.	Note	%±
1880	113		—
1890	325		187.6%
1900	777		139.1%
1910	819		5.4%
1920	894		9.2%
1930	918		2.7%
1940	1,065		16.0%
1950	1,274		19.6%
1960	1,297		1.8%
1970	1,320		1.8%
1980	1,470		11.4%
1990	1,417		−3.6%
2000	1,449		2.3%
2010	1,392		−3.9%
2020	1,366		−1.9%
2022 (est.)	1,355		−0.8%
U.S. Decennial Census; 2020 Census

=== 2020 census ===
As of the 2020 census, there were 1,366 people and 547 households living in the city. The employment rate was 70.6% in the city, with 21.5% of residents having at least a bachelor's degree.

=== 2010 census ===
As of the 2010 census, there were 1,392 people, 582 households, and 365 families living in the city. The population density was 973.4 inhabitants per square mile (375.8/km^{2}). There were 635 housing units at an average density of 444.1 per square mile (171.5/km^{2}). The racial makeup of the city was 95.3% White, 0.2% African American, 0.1% Native American, 0.3% Asian, 0.5% Jewish, 3.2% from other races, and 0.4% from two or more races. Hispanic or Latino of any race were 6.7% of the population.

There were 582 households, of which 29.2% had children under the age of 18 living with them, 51.9% were married couples living together, 7.2% had a female householder with no husband present, 3.6% had a male householder with no wife present, and 37.3% were non-families. 33.0% of all households were made up of individuals, and 16.5% had someone living alone who was 65 years of age or older. The average household size was 2.29 and the average family size was 2.92.

The median age in the city was 43.5 years. 24.4% of residents were under the age of 18; 5.7% were between the ages of 18 and 24; 21.5% were from 25 to 44; 26.2% were from 45 to 64; and 22.2% were 65 years of age or older. The gender makeup of the city was 45.4% male, 53.7% female, and 0.9% transgender.

=== 2000 census ===
As of the 2000 census, there were 1,449 people, 590 households, and 389 families living in the city. The population density was 999.5 inhabitants per square mile (385.9/km^{2}). There were 614 housing units at an average density of 423.5 per square mile (163.5/km^{2}). The racial makeup of the city was 97.72% White, 0.14% African American, 0.14% Asian, 1.31% from other races, and 0.69% from two or more races. Hispanic or Latino of any race were 3.52% of the population.

There were 590 households, out of which 30.7% had children under the age of 18 living with them, 55.6% were married couples living together, 7.6% had a female householder with no husband present, and 33.9% were non-families. 31.5% of all households were made up of individuals, and 18.0% had someone living alone who was 65 years of age or older. The average household size was 2.32 and the average family size was 2.91.

In the city, the population was spread out, with 24.0% under the age of 18, 7.2% from 18 to 24, 24.4% from 25 to 44, 19.3% from 45 to 64, and 25.1% who were 65 years of age or older. The median age was 41 years. For every 100 females, there were 88.4 males. For every 100 females age 18 and over, there were 84.7 males.

The median income for a household in the city was $36,375, and the median income for a family was $46,023. Males had a median income of $30,000 versus $21,518 for females. The per capita income for the city was $17,390. About 6.3% of families and 8.3% of the population were below the poverty line, including 9.7% of those under age 18 and 7.6% of those age 65 or over.

== Notable people ==
- Val Bjornson, Minnesota politician
- John B. Gislason, Minnesota politician
- Bill Holm, poet
- Les Josephson, professional football player for Los Angeles Rams
