= Marshall, Minnesota =

City in Minnesota, United States

Marshall
- City
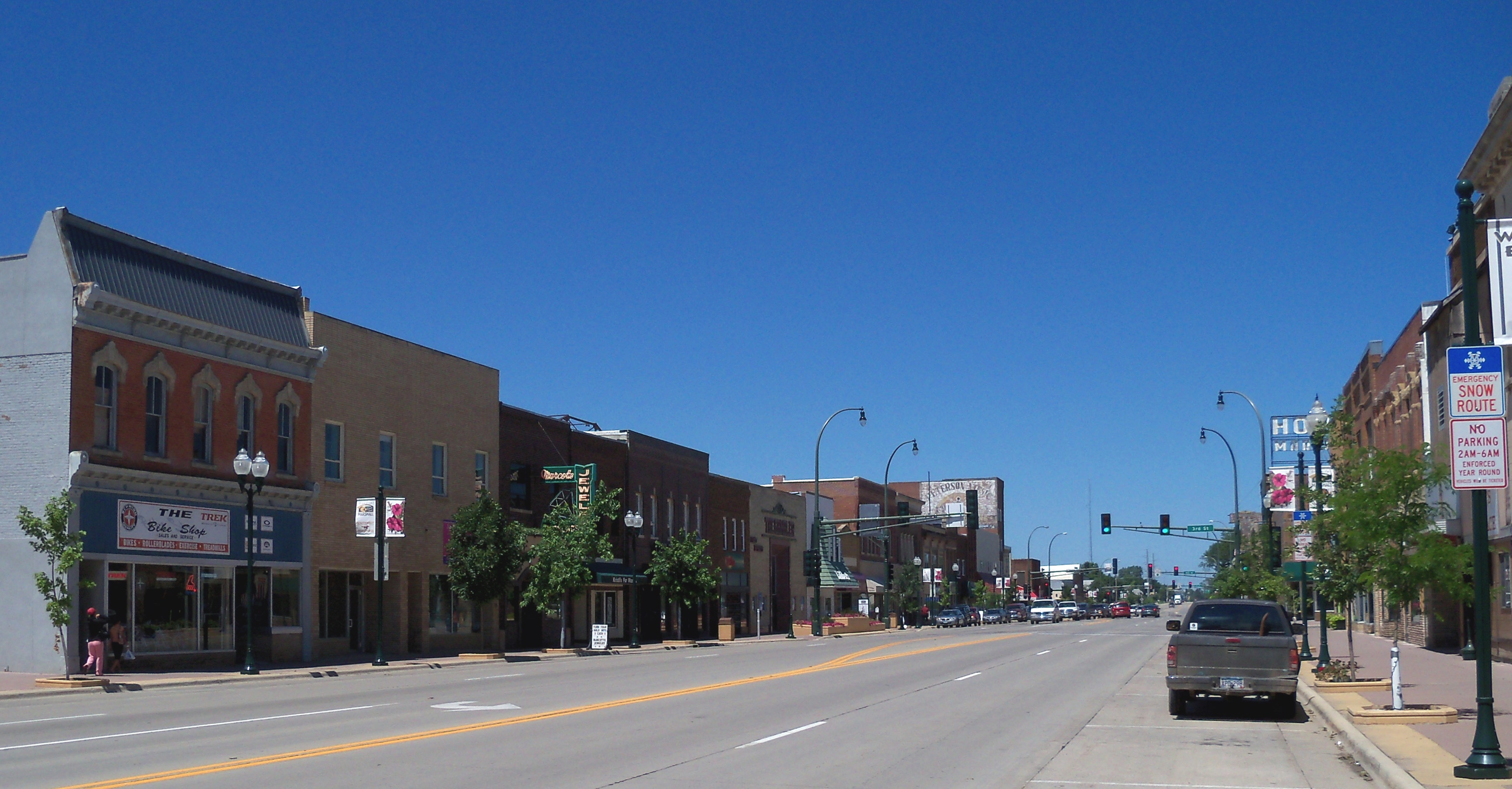
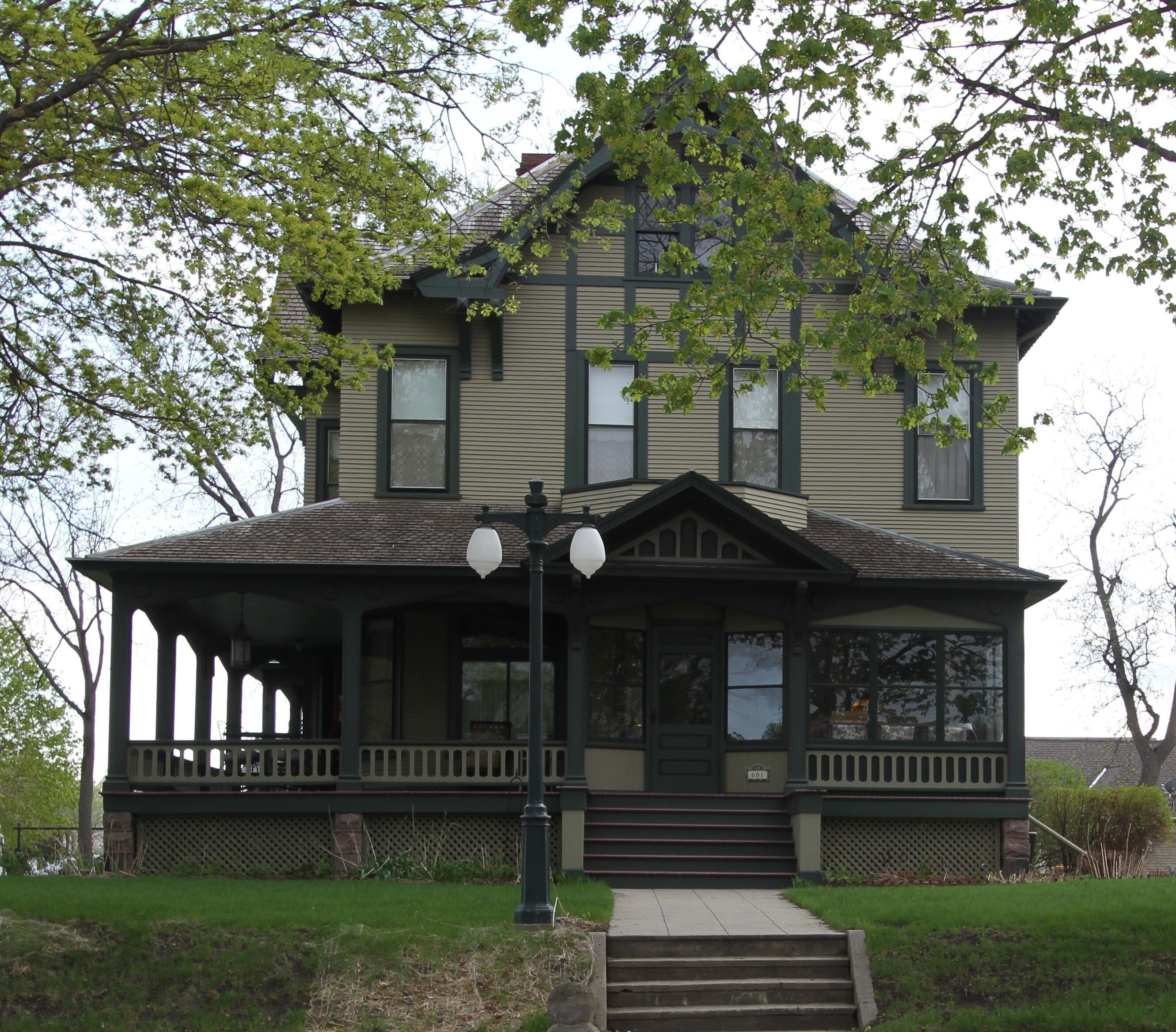
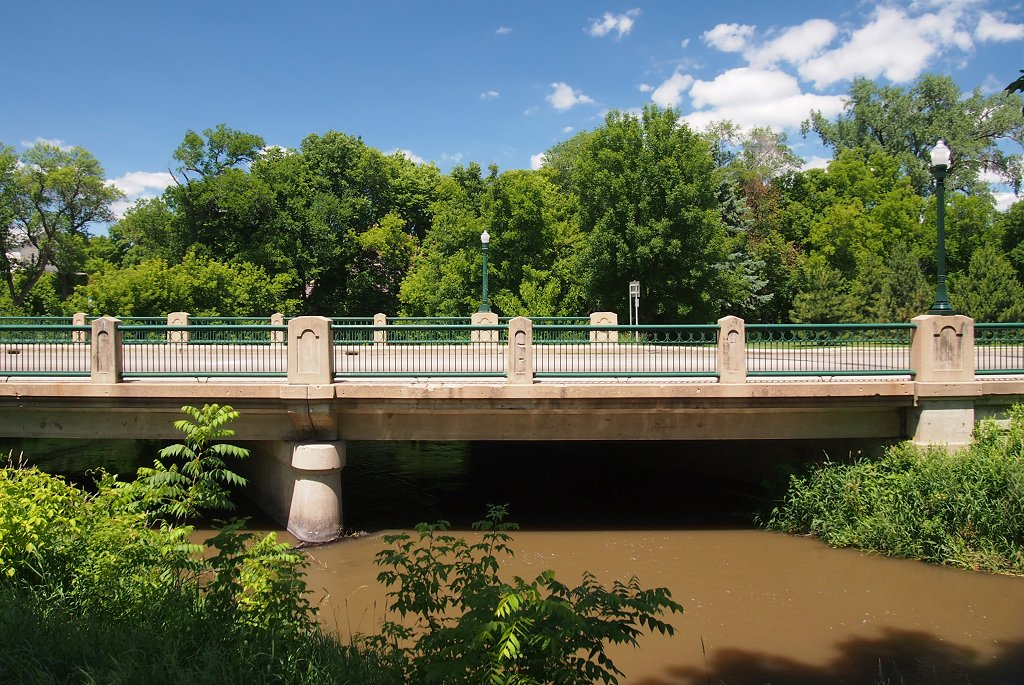
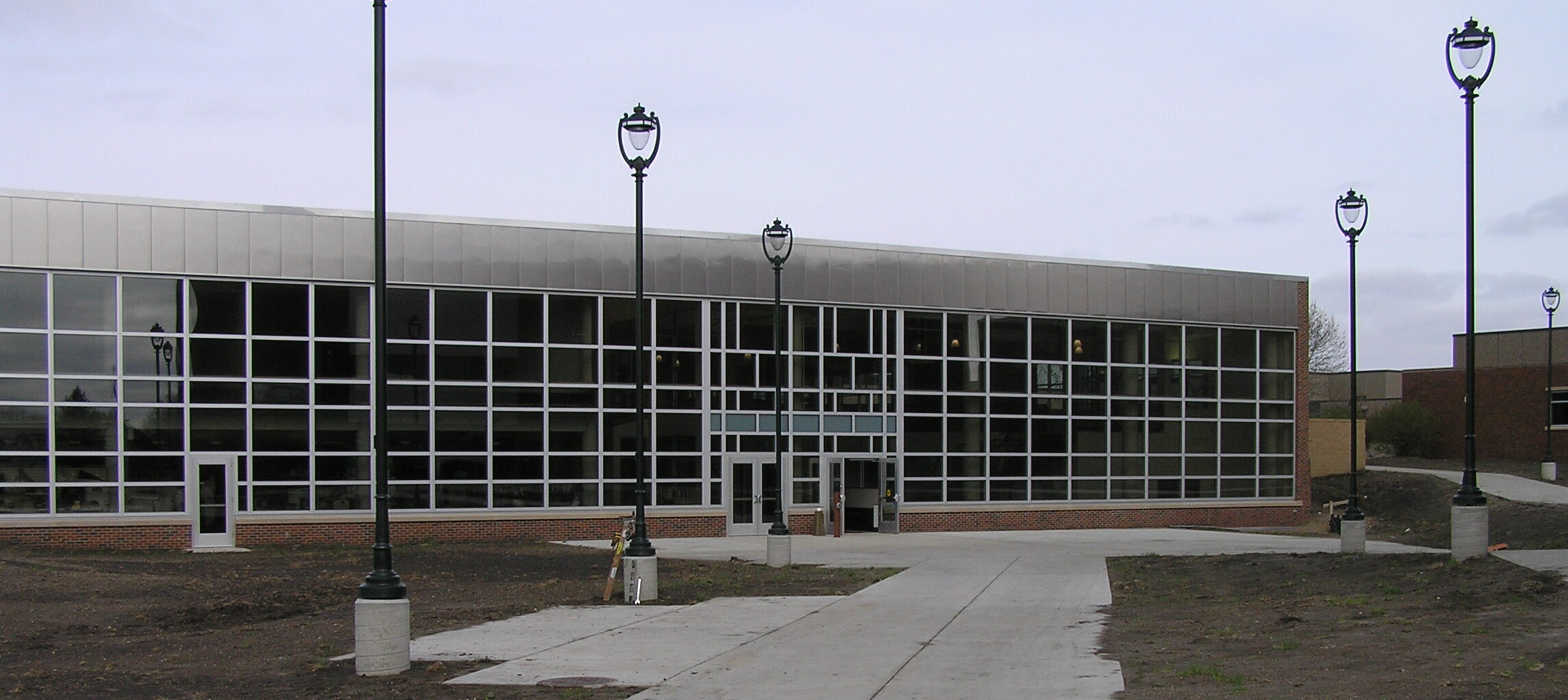
- Downtown Marshall William F. Gieseke House Bridge No. 5083 and Redwood River Southwest Minnesota State University
- Motto: "Cultivating the Best in Us"
- Location of the city of Marshall within Lyon County in the state of Minnesota
- Coordinates: 44°26′56″N 95°47′22″W
- Country: United States
- State: Minnesota
- County: Lyon
- Platted: 1872
- Incorporated (village): 1876
- Incorporated (city): February 20, 1901

Government
  - Type: Mayor – Council
  - Mayor: Robert Byrnes

Area
  - Total: 10.22 sq mi (26.48 km^{2})
  - Land: 10.22 sq mi (26.46 km^{2})
  - Water: 0.0077 sq mi (0.02 km^{2})
- Elevation: 1,161 ft (354 m)

Population (2020)
  - Total: 13,628
  - Estimate (2023): 13,906
  - Density: 1,333.9/sq mi (515.02/km^{2})
- Time zone: UTC−6 (Central (CST))
  - Summer (DST): UTC−5 (CDT)
- ZIP Code: 56258
- Area code: 507
- FIPS code: 27-40688
- GNIS feature ID: 2395022
- Sales tax: 7.375%
- Website: ci.marshall.mn.us

Marshall is a city in Lyon County, Minnesota, United States. The population was 13,628 at the 2020 census and 13,906 as of 2023 estimates. Marshall is a regional center in southwest Minnesota, and the county seat of Lyon County. It is the headquarters of the Schwan Food Company and the home of Southwest Minnesota State University.

== History ==
Marshall was platted in 1872 when the railroad was extended to that point. Lake Marshall Township had been established in the area in 1870, and included a post office and several farms. Before that, the site was occasionally used as a campground for groups of Dakota, who hunted and traveled throughout the region. After much discussion, James J. Manton decided on Marshall in honor of Governor William R. Marshall.

The town grew rapidly. In 1873, Samuel Biglari published Marshall's first newspaper, the Prairie Schooner. In the October 25, 1873, issue, he wrote, "Nine months ago the first house was erected. Now there are 79 permanent buildings already constructed, and this number will be increased by others already planned." Marshall became an incorporated village in 1876 and a city on February 20, 1901. In April 1874, the local paper estimated Marshall's population at 300; by 1900 it was 2,088. Holy Redeemer Catholic Church was built in 1884. The Weiner Memorial Hospital was built in 1950. Also during the 1950s, Marvin Schwan transformed his dairy into an ice-cream home-delivery service, which eventually grew into the Schwan Food Company.

The flooding of the Redwood River had historically been a problem in Marshall. The city experienced a series of floods in the 1940s and 1950s. Diversion canals were constructed between 1961 and 1963, but occasional flooding still occurs, notably in 1993. Another project in 1997 removed 107,000 cubic meters (140,000 cubic yards) of sediment from the diversion channel. The diversion channel and Redwood River underwent major upstream and downstream improvements, completed in 2000. During the spring and fall of 2010, the Marshall area experienced unseasonably high amounts of moisture, but the Redwood River remained within its banks through town.

Southwest Minnesota State University was founded in 1963 and opened in 1967. Most of the campus was constructed between 1967 and 1973.

== Geography ==
Marshall is 150 km (93 mi) northeast of Sioux Falls, South Dakota, and 238 km (148 mi) southwest of Minneapolis. According to the United States Census Bureau, the city has an area of 10.08 square miles (26.11 km^{2}), of which 10.07 square miles (26.08 km^{2}) is land and 0.01 square miles (0.03 km^{2}) is water. It is in a predominantly rural and agricultural area that was originally an expanse of northern tallgrass prairie. The Redwood River's flood plain begins in Marshall.

U.S. Highway 59 and Minnesota State Highways 19, 23, and 68 are four of the main routes in the city. Greyhound Bus Lines provides intercity service.

The Southwest Minnesota Regional Airport-Marshall/Ryan Field is a municipal airport. The 2,200-meter (7,200-foot) runway can handle commercial airliners. Marshall is not served by scheduled air service, but charter flights are available.

=== Climate ===
Climate data for Marshall, Minnesota (1991−2020 normals, extremes 1935−present)
Month	Jan	Feb	Mar	Apr	May	Jun	Jul	Aug	Sep	Oct	Nov	Dec	Year
Record high °F (°C)	67 (19)	65 (18)	83 (28)	94 (34)	101 (38)	106 (41)	109 (43)	106 (41)	102 (39)	94 (34)	80 (27)	73 (23)	109 (43)
Mean maximum °F (°C)	45.5 (7.5)	50.6 (10.3)	66.6 (19.2)	80.8 (27.1)	90.1 (32.3)	94.6 (34.8)	95.4 (35.2)	93.1 (33.9)	90.3 (32.4)	83.4 (28.6)	65.5 (18.6)	49.0 (9.4)	97.6 (36.4)
Mean daily maximum °F (°C)	24.5 (−4.2)	29.0 (−1.7)	41.2 (5.1)	56.8 (13.8)	70.1 (21.2)	80.6 (27.0)	84.7 (29.3)	82.2 (27.9)	75.3 (24.1)	60.2 (15.7)	43.3 (6.3)	29.6 (−1.3)	56.5 (13.6)
Daily mean °F (°C)	14.0 (−10.0)	18.3 (−7.6)	30.3 (−0.9)	44.5 (6.9)	58.1 (14.5)	68.9 (20.5)	72.9 (22.7)	70.4 (21.3)	62.4 (16.9)	48.1 (8.9)	32.9 (0.5)	19.9 (−6.7)	45.1 (7.3)
Mean daily minimum °F (°C)	3.6 (−15.8)	7.5 (−13.6)	19.5 (−6.9)	32.2 (0.1)	46.1 (7.8)	57.2 (14.0)	61.0 (16.1)	58.6 (14.8)	49.5 (9.7)	36.0 (2.2)	22.5 (−5.3)	10.1 (−12.2)	33.7 (0.9)
Mean minimum °F (°C)	−16.4 (−26.9)	−12.6 (−24.8)	−1.9 (−18.8)	19.1 (−7.2)	32.6 (0.3)	46.6 (8.1)	50.9 (10.5)	48.5 (9.2)	35.5 (1.9)	20.8 (−6.2)	4.7 (−15.2)	−10.4 (−23.6)	−19.8 (−28.8)
Record low °F (°C)	−32 (−36)	−36 (−38)	−24 (−31)	2 (−17)	21 (−6)	32 (0)	42 (6)	38 (3)	22 (−6)	5 (−15)	−15 (−26)	−34 (−37)	−36 (−38)
Average precipitation inches (mm)	0.86 (22)	0.87 (22)	1.60 (41)	2.79 (71)	3.66 (93)	4.10 (104)	3.78 (96)	3.61 (92)	3.06 (78)	2.29 (58)	1.26 (32)	1.02 (26)	28.90 (734)
Average snowfall inches (cm)	6.6 (17)	8.1 (21)	7.6 (19)	4.9 (12)	0.1 (0.25)	0.0 (0.0)	0.0 (0.0)	0.0 (0.0)	0.0 (0.0)	0.8 (2.0)	5.3 (13)	10.1 (26)	43.5 (110)
Average precipitation days (≥ 0.01 in)	5.3	5.3	6.0	8.5	11.3	11.0	8.4	8.3	7.3	7.6	5.0	5.4	89.4
Average snowy days (≥ 0.1 in)	4.8	4.8	3.3	1.5	0.1	0.0	0.0	0.0	0.0	0.5	2.5	5.1	22.6
Source: NOAA

== Demographics ==
Historical population
Census	Pop.	Note	%±
1880	961		—
1890	1,203		25.2%
1900	2,088		73.6%
1910	2,152		3.1%
1920	3,092		43.7%
1930	3,250		5.1%
1940	4,590		41.2%
1950	5,923		29.0%
1960	6,681		12.8%
1970	9,886		48.0%
1980	11,161		12.9%
1990	12,023		7.7%
2000	12,735		5.9%
2010	13,680		7.4%
2020	13,628		−0.4%
2023 (est.)	13,906		2.0%
U.S. Decennial Census; 2020 Census

=== 2020 census ===
As of the 2020 census, Marshall had a population of 13,628. The median age was 33.9 years. 25.7% of residents were under the age of 18 and 16.0% of residents were 65 years of age or older. For every 100 females there were 97.6 males, and for every 100 females age 18 and over there were 95.2 males age 18 and over.

98.9% of residents lived in urban areas, while 1.1% lived in rural areas.

There were 5,473 households in Marshall, of which 29.7% had children under the age of 18 living in them. Of all households, 42.2% were married-couple households, 21.8% were households with a male householder and no spouse or partner present, and 29.9% were households with a female householder and no spouse or partner present. About 35.1% of all households were made up of individuals and 13.6% had someone living alone who was 65 years of age or older.

There were 5,986 housing units, of which 8.6% were vacant. The homeowner vacancy rate was 2.2% and the rental vacancy rate was 12.1%.

Racial composition as of the 2020 census
Race	Number	Percent
White	10,315	75.7%
Black or African American	859	6.3%
American Indian and Alaska Native	96	0.7%
Asian	966	7.1%
Native Hawaiian and Other Pacific Islander	3	0.0%
Some other race	607	4.5%
Two or more races	782	5.7%
Hispanic or Latino (of any race)	1,290	9.5%

=== 2010 census ===
As of the census of 2010, there were 13,680 people, 5,394 households, and 2,992 families living in the city. The population density was 1,358.5 inhabitants per square mile (524.5/km^{2}). There were 5,744 housing units at an average density of 570.4 units per square mile (220.2 units/km^{2}). The racial makeup of the city was 86.8% White, 4.0% African American, 0.6% Native American, 3.0% Asian, 3.6% from other races, and 2.0% from two or more races. Hispanic or Latino of any race were 7.8% of the population.

There were 5,394 households, of which 29.2% had children under the age of 18 living with them, 43.3% were married couples living together, 9.0% had a female householder with no husband present, 3.2% had a male householder with no wife present, and 44.5% were non-families. 32.9% of all households were made up of individuals, and 11% had someone living alone who was 65 years of age or older. The average household size was 2.36 and the average family size was 3.04.

The median age in the city was 29.7 years. 22.6% of residents were under the age of 18; 19.6% were between the ages of 18 and 24; 24.9% were from 25 to 44; 21.4% were from 45 to 64; and 11.4% were 65 years of age or older. The gender makeup of the city was 49.5% male and 50.5% female.

=== 2000 census ===
As of the census of 2000, there were 12,735 people, 4,914 households, and 2,914 families living in the city. The population density was 1,537.0 inhabitants per square mile (593.4/km^{2}). There were 5,182 housing units at an average density of 625.4 units per square mile (241.5 units/km^{2}). The racial makeup of the city was 91.35% White, 2.79% Black or African American, 0.35% American Indian or Alaska Native, 1.52% Asian, 0.03% Native Hawaiian or Other Pacific Islander, 2.61% from other races, and 1.34% from two or more races. Hispanic or Latino of any race were 5.93% of the population.

There were 4,914 households, out of which 30.5% had children under the age of 18 living with them, 48.0% were married couples living together, 8.6% had a female householder with no husband present, and 40.7% were non-families. 30.4% of all households were made up of individuals, and 12.1% had someone living alone who was 65 years of age or older. The average household size was 2.39 and the average family size was 3.04.

In the city, the population was spread out, with 23.9% under the age of 18, 19.1% from 18 to 24, 26.8% from 25 to 44, 17.7% from 45 to 64, and 12.4% who were 65 years of age or older. The median age was 30 years. For every 100 females, there were 91.7 males. For every 100 females age 18 and over, there were 90.5 males.

The median income for a household in the city was $37,950, and the median income for a family was $52,284. Males had a median income of $35,478 versus $21,640 for females. The per capita income for the city was $18,588. About 7.8% of families and 12.4% of the population were below the poverty line, including 10.3% of those under age 18 and 16.7% of those age 65 or over.

=== Religion ===
69.6% of Marshall residents affiliate with a particular religion: 34.5% report that they are Catholic, 31.4% are Protestant, and 2.9% are another Christian faith. 0.8% are Mormon.

== Economy ==
Schwan's Company, headquartered in Marshall, is one of the country's largest frozen-food companies. It is a $3 billion organization and Minnesota's third-largest privately held corporation, after Cargill and Carlson. With about 14,000 employees in the U.S., Schwan has become one of the nation's largest producers of frozen pizza and egg rolls. It is also known for its frozen desserts and ice-cream manufacturing and distribution. Schwan employs about 1,500 people in Marshall.

One of Marshall's streets downtown, Marvin Schwan Memorial Drive, between College Drive (Marshall's main through street) and A Street, is named for the founder of the Schwan Food Company, who died in 1993. Until his death, it was called Depot Street.

A large corn wet-milling facility operated by Archer Daniels Midland Company is in Marshall. It was formerly run by a farmer's cooperative, Minnesota Corn Processors, but merged with ADM in 2002. The plant employs 250 people.

Runnings is a regional retail chain with headquarters in Marshall.

Other major employers in the city are US Bancorp, Affiliated Community Medical Centers (ACMC), Avera Marshall Regional Medical Center, Hy-Vee, Walmart, Runnings, Menards, Southwest Minnesota State University, Turkey Valley Farms, and Marshall Public Schools.

== Government ==
Marshall has a mayor and city council that meet twice monthly. The city is divided into three wards, with two council members for each ward. The mayor and council members are elected to four-year terms. The elected officials govern in coordination with a city administrator and city attorney. The major divisions of city hall are City Administration, Community Services, Economic Development, General Services, Public Safety, and Public Works.

== Education ==
Public schools in district 413 include Marshall High School, Marshall Middle School, Park Side Elementary, Southview Elementary, and Marshall Area Learning Center, an alternative high school. The district also operates a Career and Technical Institute. Marshall's athletic teams are called the Tigers. Private schools include Holy Redeemer, True Light Christian, and Samuel Lutheran School.

The Marshall-Lyon County Library is part of the Plum Creek Library System and contains 75,803 books, 3,142 audio materials, 2,302 video materials, and 205 periodical subscriptions.

Southwest Minnesota State University is a public, four-year liberal arts and professional studies institution. It has an enrollment of approximately 3,500 full-time students.

== Notable people ==
- Ruth Anderson (b. 1899), oldest living person in Minnesota until she died in 2011
- Blaise Andries (b. 1998), football player
- Yahya Black (b. 2002), NFL player
- John Ely Burchard (1898–1975), professor and dean at the Massachusetts Institute of Technology
- Leland Bush, judge of the District Court of Minnesota
- Casper Fischer (1929–2022), Minnesota state legislator
- Gordon Forbes, Minnesota state legislator and lawyer
- Randall B. Griepp, cardiovascular surgeon
- Bill Gullickson (b. 1959), Major League Baseball pitcher
- Carly Gullickson, professional tennis player, daughter of Bill Gullickson
- Walt Jocketty, Major League Baseball general manager for the Cincinnati Reds and the St. Louis Cardinals
- Trey Lance, American football quarterback
- Eric Markusen, Holocaust and genocide studies scholar, professor at Southwest Minnesota State University
- Greg Olson, MLB catcher
- Lois Quam, health care reform leader and executive, graduated from Marshall High School in 1979
- Pete Regnier (1896–1938), National Football League player
- Marvin Schwan, founder of the Schwan Food Company
- Marty Seifert (b. 1972), former Republican minority leader of the Minnesota State House of Representatives
- Brandon Swanson, college student who mysteriously disappeared in 2008
- Sean Tillmann (b. 1978, aka Har Mar Superstar), singer-songwriter, actor
- Isiah Whitlock Jr., actor, The Wire and Cedar Rapids, studied theater at Southwest Minnesota State University
- Steve Zahn (b. 1967), film and stage comedian and actor
