= The Tower =

The Tower may refer to:

== Architecture ==
- Tower of London, a castle in London, England, started in 1078
- The Tower (Dubai), a building in United Arab Emirates, built in 2002
- The Tower at Dubai Creek Harbour, a building in United Arab Emirates
- Partnership House, an office tower in Newcastle upon Tyne, England originally named The Tower
- The Tower, Meridian Quay, a residential tower in Swansea, Wales
- The Tower Jakarta, an office tower in Indonesia
- Nakheel Tower or The Tower, a skyscraper under construction in the United Arab Emirates
- Prospect Park Water Tower, an historic water tower on top of Tower Hill Park in Minneapolis, Minnesota, U.S.
- The Tower (Fort Worth, Texas), a residential tower in Texas, U.S.
- Main Building (University of Texas at Austin) or The Tower, Texas, U.S.
- Tower Theatre (disambiguation), several theaters

== Literature ==
- The Tower (poetry collection), a book of poems by William Butler Yeats, published in 1928
  - "The Tower" (poem), by William Butler Yeats
- The Tower (Stern novel), a novel by Richard Martin Stern, 1973, adapted into the film The Towering Inferno
- The Tower (Wilson novel), a novel by Colin Wilson
- La Tour (comics), known in English as The Tower, the third volume of the Belgian graphic novel series Les Cités Obscures
- The Tower Magazine, a monthly online magazine on Israel and Middle East subjects edited by David Hazony
- The Tower, a student newspaper of Kean University
- The Tower, a student newspaper of Catholic University of America

== Film and television ==
=== Film ===
- The Tower (Wednesday Theatre), a 1965 Australian television play
- The Tower (1985 film), a Canadian sci-fi television film
- The Tower (1993 film), an action drama film with music composed by John D'Andrea
- The Tower (2002 film), an American film whose music was composed by Christopher Young
- The Tower (2012 South Korean film), starring Son Ye-jin and Sol Kyung-gu
- The Tower (2012 German film), a TV drama film based on the novel by Uwe Tellkamp
- The Tower (2018 film), a Norwegian animated film about a 11-year-old Palestinian girl

=== Television ===
- The Tower (TV series), a 2021–2024 British police procedural series
- The Tower: A Tale of Two Cities, a 2007 British documentary about the Pepys Estate in South London
- "The Tower" (Adventure Time), a 2014 episode
- "The Tower" (Once Upon a Time), a 2014 episode
- "The Tower" (Stargate Atlantis), a 2006 episode
- "The Tower" (The Walking Dead), a 2020 episode

== Music ==
- The Tower (The Legendary Pink Dots album), a 1984 album
- The Tower (Bob Catley album), released in 1998
- "The Tower" (song), a 2024 song by Luna
- "The Tower", a song on the album Wrong by NoMeansNo
- "The Tower", a song on the album Spanish Train and Other Stories by Chris de Burgh
- "The Tower", a song on the album The Tempest by Insane Clown Posse
- "The Tower", a song on the album Phobos by Voivod
- "The Tower", a song on the album The Chemical Wedding by Bruce Dickinson
- "The Tower", a song on the album The Metal Opera by Avantasia
- "The Tower", a song on the album Waking Hour by Vienna Teng
- "The Tower", a song on the album O.G. Original Gangster by Ice-T
- "Celestial (The Tower)", a song on the album Celestial by Isis

== Other uses ==
- The Tower (Alberta), the unofficial name for a peak located in the Kananaskis Range, Alberta, Canada
- The Tower (Lynch, Nebraska), a hill visited by the Lewis and Clark Expedition
- The Tower (tarot card), or The Tower (XVI), a Major Arcana card in tarot
- The Tower, Melbourne, a flexible performing space within the Malthouse Theatre in Melbourne, Australia
- The Tower SP, a 2005 skyscraper simulation game and spiritual sequel to SimTower

== See also ==
- Tower (disambiguation)
- The Towers (disambiguation)
- Skyscraper (disambiguation)
