= Intercity Bridge =

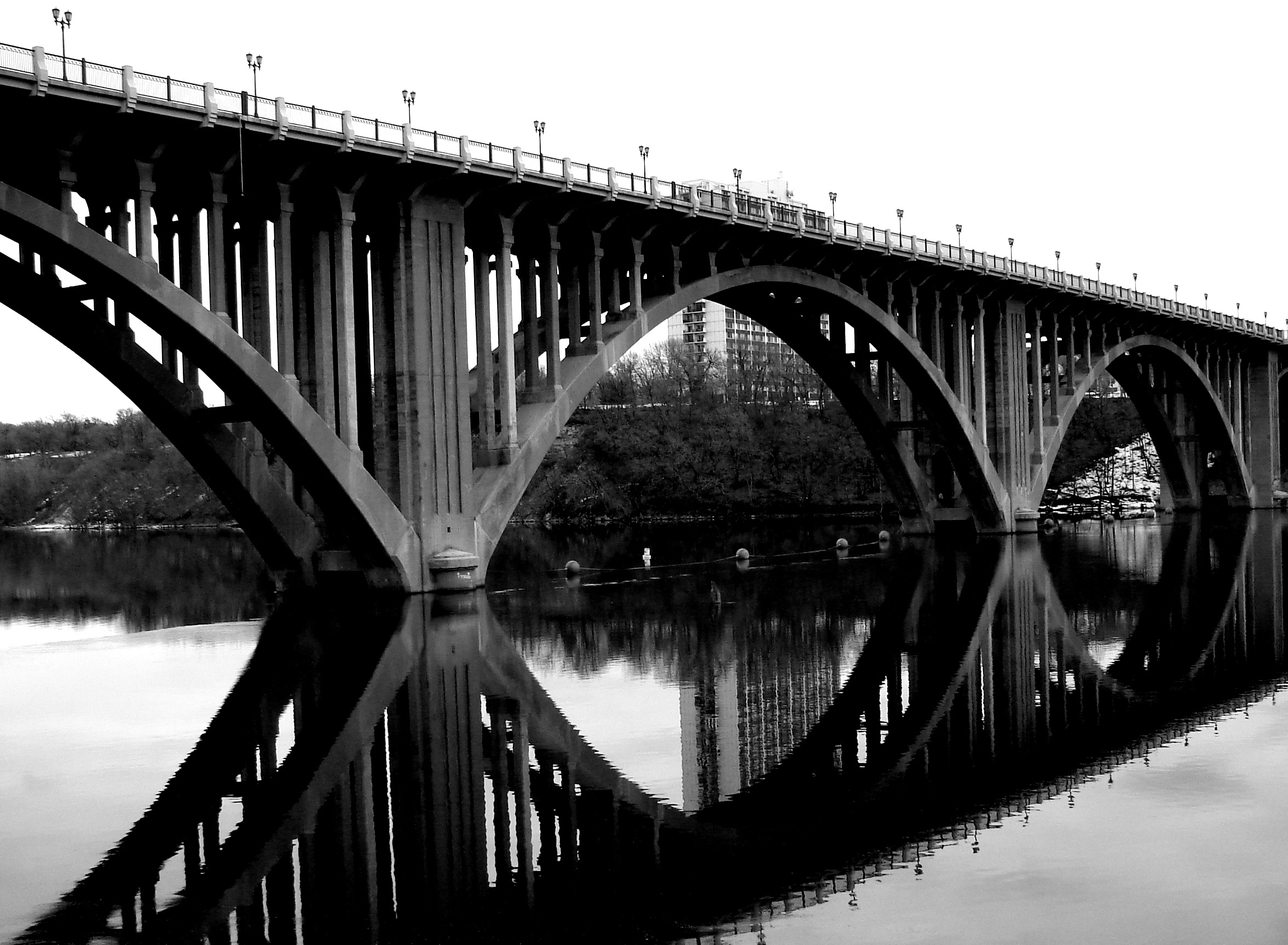
- Coordinates: 44°55′4.25″N 93°12′4.90″W
- Carries: Four lanes of vehicle traffic plus bike lanes and pedestrian walkways (Ford Parkway in St. Paul to 46th Street in Minneapolis)
- Crosses: Mississippi River
- Locale: Minneapolis-St. Paul, Minnesota
- ID number: 3575

Characteristics
- Design: Concrete arch
- Total length: 1,523.6 ft (464.4 m)
- Width: 64.7 ft (19.7 m)
- Longest span: Three main spans of 300 feet

History
- Opened: 1927
- Intercity Bridge
- U.S. National Register of Historic Places
- Location within Minnesota
- Location: Ford Pkwy. over Mississippi River, Minneapolis, Minnesota
- Area: less than one acre
- Built: 1927
- Built by: James O. Heyworth, Inc.
- Architect: Martin Sigvart Grytbak
- Architectural style: Reinforced-concrete bridge
- MPS: Reinforced-Concrete Highway Bridges in Minnesota MPS
- NRHP reference No.: 89001838
- Added to NRHP: November 6, 1989

Location
- Interactive map of Intercity Bridge

The Intercity Bridge, more commonly known as the Ford Parkway Bridge (and sometimes referred to as the 46th Street Bridge by residents of Minneapolis), is a reinforced concrete arch bridge that spans the Mississippi River between Minneapolis, Minnesota and St. Paul, Minnesota, United States. It connects 46th Street in Minneapolis with Ford Parkway in Saint Paul. The bridge is historically significant as one of the largest reinforced concrete bridges ever built in Minnesota. It was built in 1925-1927 by James O. Heyworth, Inc. and was designed by Martin Sigvart Grytbak. The Intercity Bridge was listed on the National Register of Historic Places in 1989. It is notable as one of the monumental concrete rib-arch bridges spanning the high river bluffs along the Mississippi River, along with the Franklin Avenue Bridge, the Third Avenue Bridge, the 10th Avenue Bridge, and the Robert Street Bridge.

The bridge was originally built to service Ford's Twin Cities Assembly Plant, so Minneapolis residents could commute to the Ford plant. The Ford plant, along with Lock and Dam No. 1, was expected to make the Highland Park area of St. Paul extremely desirable. As part of the planned development, St. Paul expanded the original street, Edsel Avenue, and renamed it Ford Parkway. The bridge project was designed by a committee of politicians and engineers from both Minneapolis and St. Paul and chaired by Charles M. Babcock, Minnesota's first commissioner of highways. The development that was expected as a result of the bridge did not materialize, however, because of the Great Depression and growth in Minneapolis neighborhoods on the opposite side of the bridge. It was not until after World War II that the desired growth in the Highland Park area resulted from the bridge.

In 1972-1973, the bridge was redecked and widened, but this did not detract from the historic significance of the bridge. In 2004, the bridge was rebuilt from the arches up. The rebuilding project was given an award by the Minnesota Society of Professional Engineers in 2006.

== Pictures ==
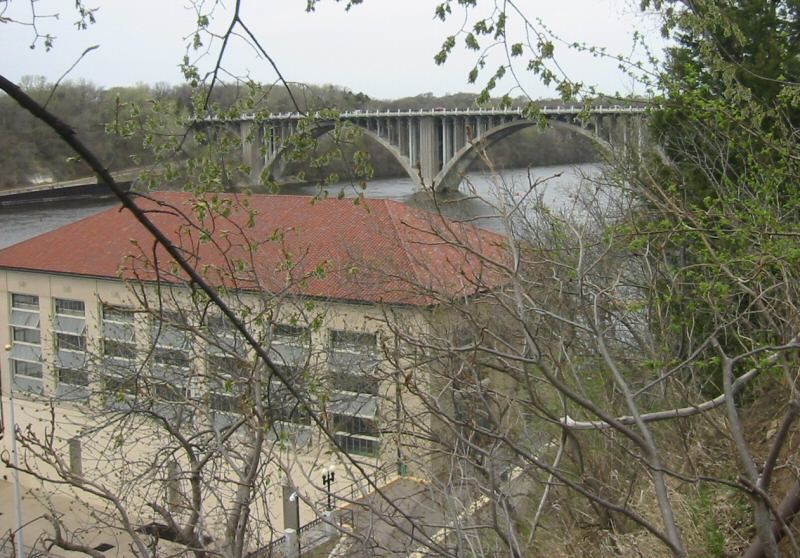
A view from the south side, with the powerhouse of the Ford Dam in the foreground.

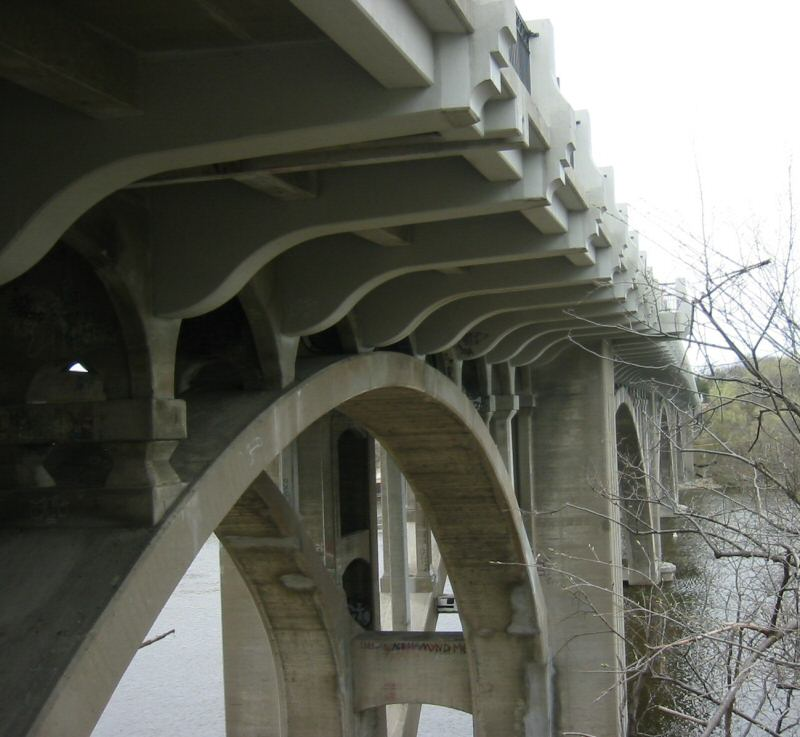
A view from underneath the bridge on the St. Paul side, looking west.

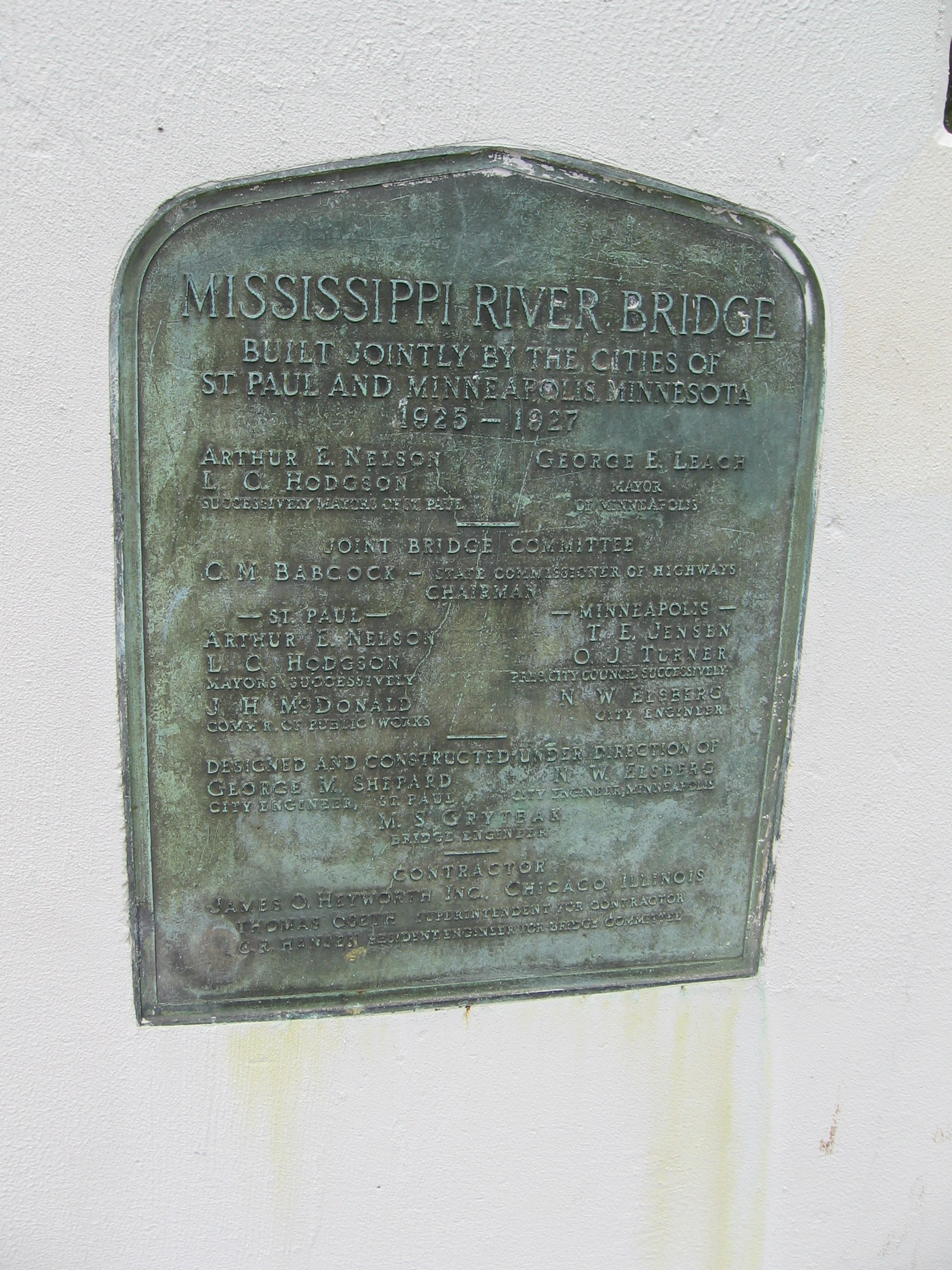
Plaque commemorating the construction of the Intercity Bridge on the St. Paul side.

== See also ==
- List of crossings of the Upper Mississippi River
