= Tower (disambiguation) =

A tower is a tall human-made structure.

Tower may also refer to:

== Types of towers ==
- Air traffic control tower
- Bell tower
- Cell tower, a cellular telephone communications site
- Clock tower
- Computer tower
- Conning tower
- Cooling tower
- Drop tower, an amusement park ride
- Fire lookout tower
- Fortified tower
- Interlocking tower or control cabin, directs railroad traffic
- Lattice tower or truss tower
- Martello tower, a small defensive fort
- Office tower
- Peel tower, a small fortified keep or tower house
- Radio tower
- Siege tower or breaching tower
- Telecommunications tower (disambiguation)
- Television tower
- Tower houses in the Balkans, tower houses built in the Balkans
- Transmission tower, used for electric power transmission
- Watchtower, a type fortification used in many parts of the world
- Water tower

== Places ==
=== Geography ===
- Tower (ward), ward of the City of London, England
- Tower, County Cork, Ireland
- Tower, Michigan, United States
- Tower, Minnesota, United States
- Tower Branch, a stream in Pennsylvania, United States

=== Buildings with the name ===
- Tower of London, also known as "The Tower"
- Towers (Boston University), a dormitory at Boston University
- Trump Tower, a mixed use commercial and residential building in New York City

== People ==
- Tower (surname), also Towers (surname)

== Arts, entertainment, media and sports ==
=== Fictional entities ===
- Tower (Code Lyoko), element of virtual world in animated TV series
- Tower (comics), a Marvel Comics character

=== Music ===
- Tower (album), an album by the Finnish rock band Circle featuring Verde
- "Tower (Don't Look Down)" a song by Skylar Grey from Don't Look Down
- "Towers", a song by Little Mix
- Towers..., 1998 EP by Burning Witch

=== Other uses in arts, entertainment, and media ===
- Tower (2012 Canadian film), directed by Kazik Radwanski
- Tower (2016 film), about the 1966 shootings at the University of Texas at Austin
- "Towers", an episode of the television series Teletubbies

=== Sports ===
- Hamburg Towers, German basketball team
- London Towers, former English basketball team

== Brands and enterprises ==
- Alton Towers, a theme park and resort located in Staffordshire, England
- Tower Comics
- Tower International
- Tower Records (music retailer)
- Tower Records (record label)
- TOWER Software
- Towers Department Stores, Canada
- Tower Semiconductor, Israel

== Mathematics ==
- Tower of fields, a sequence of field extensions
- Tower of objects, in category theory
- Tower of powers, nested exponentiation

== Organizations ==
- Hamburg Towers, German basketball club
- Princeton Tower Club, an eating club at Princeton University
- Tower Transit, a bus operating company in London since 2013 owned by Transit Systems
- Tower Transit Singapore, a bus operating company in Singapore since June 2016 owned by Transit Systems
- Tower Theatre (disambiguation)

== Other uses ==
- Tower (typeface)
- Rook (chess), sometimes called a "tower"

== See also ==
- List of leaning towers
- Tall buildings in London
- The Tower (disambiguation)
- The Towers (disambiguation)
- Tower blocks in Great Britain
- Tower City (disambiguation)
