= Kristoffer Olsen Oustad =

Norwegian-American engineer (1857–1943)

Kristoffer Olsen Oustad (January 27, 1857 – February 13, 1943) was a Norwegian-American engineer who designed major structures in the United States. Often working together with three other Norwegian-American engineers (Martin Sigvart Grytbak, Andreas W. Munster and Frederick William Cappelen) he designed bridges and other buildings.

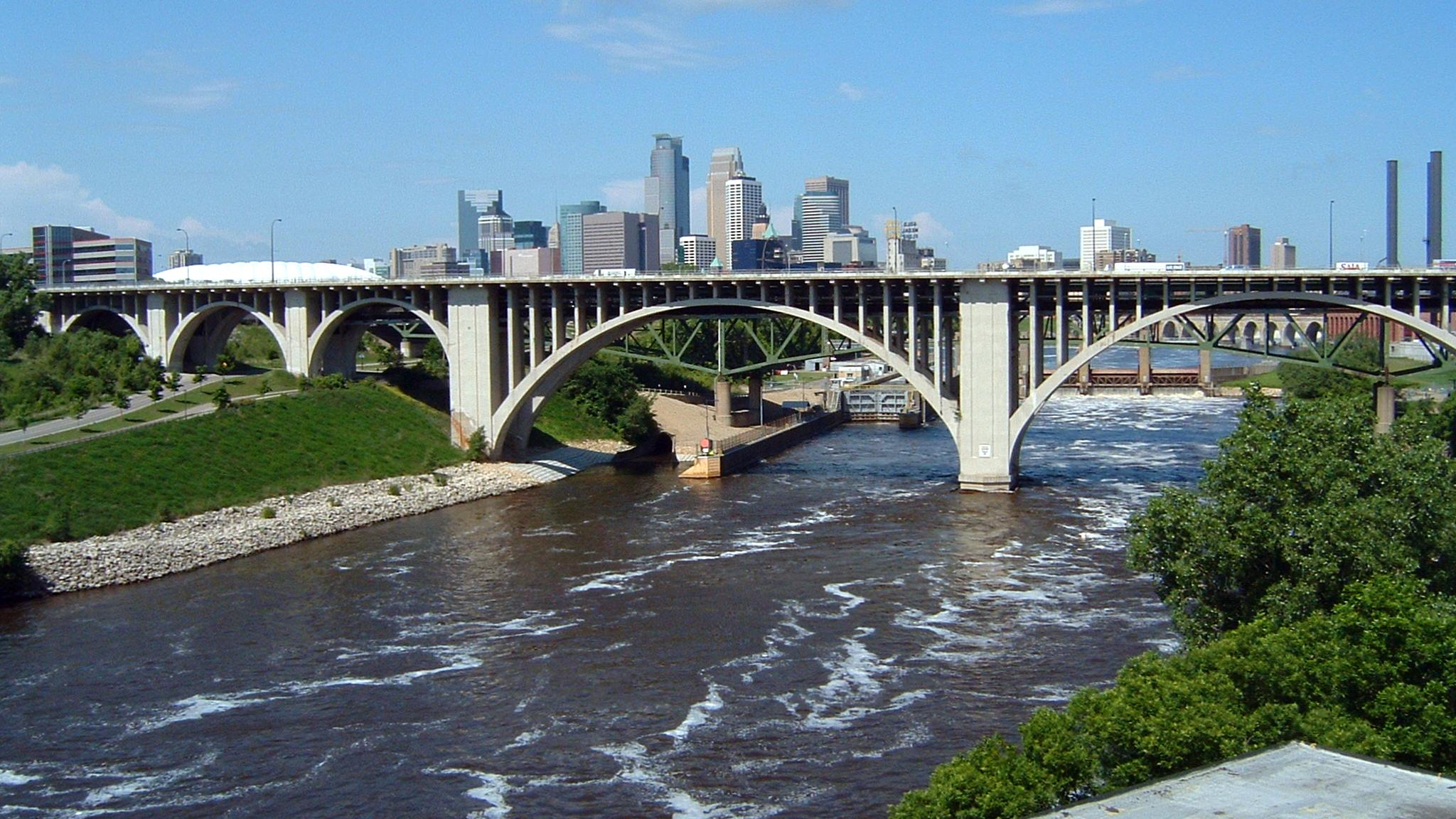
Cedar Avenue Bridge (now 10th Avenue Bridge) in Minneapolis, MN

== Biography ==
Oustad was born on the Oustad farm in Romedal Municipality in Hedmark county in eastern Norway. He was educated at the Technical College in Trondhjem (now Norwegian University of Science and Technology), graduating in 1882. He attended the Royal Saxon Polytechnicum (now Dresden University of Technology) in Dresden, Germany before emigrating to the United States.

He joined the Minneapolis City Engineer's Office in 1883 and became Municipal Bridge Engineer in 1893. Oustad designed the Cedar Avenue Bridge, assisted by Frederick T. Paul, assistant bridge engineer, under the direction of city engineer N.W. Elsberg. Oustad assisted Frederick William Cappelen in the design of the Third Avenue Bridge and the F.W. Cappelen Memorial Bridge. He completed the Cappelen Memorial Bridge when Cappelen died. Oustad retired in 1929, after the Cedar Avenue Bridge (now 10th Avenue Bridge) in Minneapolis was completed.

Oustad died on February 13, 1943, at Asbury Hospital in Minneapolis. He was buried in Lakewood Cemetery.

== See also ==
- Cedar Avenue Bridge
- Third Avenue Bridge
- F.W. Cappelen Memorial Bridge

== Other Source ==
- Bjork, Kenneth O. (1947) Saga in Steel and Concrete - Norwegian Engineers in America ( Northfield, Minnesota: Norwegian-American Historical Association)
- Costello, Mary Charlotte (2002) Climbing the Mississippi River Bridge by Bridge, Volume Two (Minnesota. Cambridge, MN: Adventure Publications) ISBN 0-9644518-2-4
