= Kenwood Park Water Tower =

Stone water tower

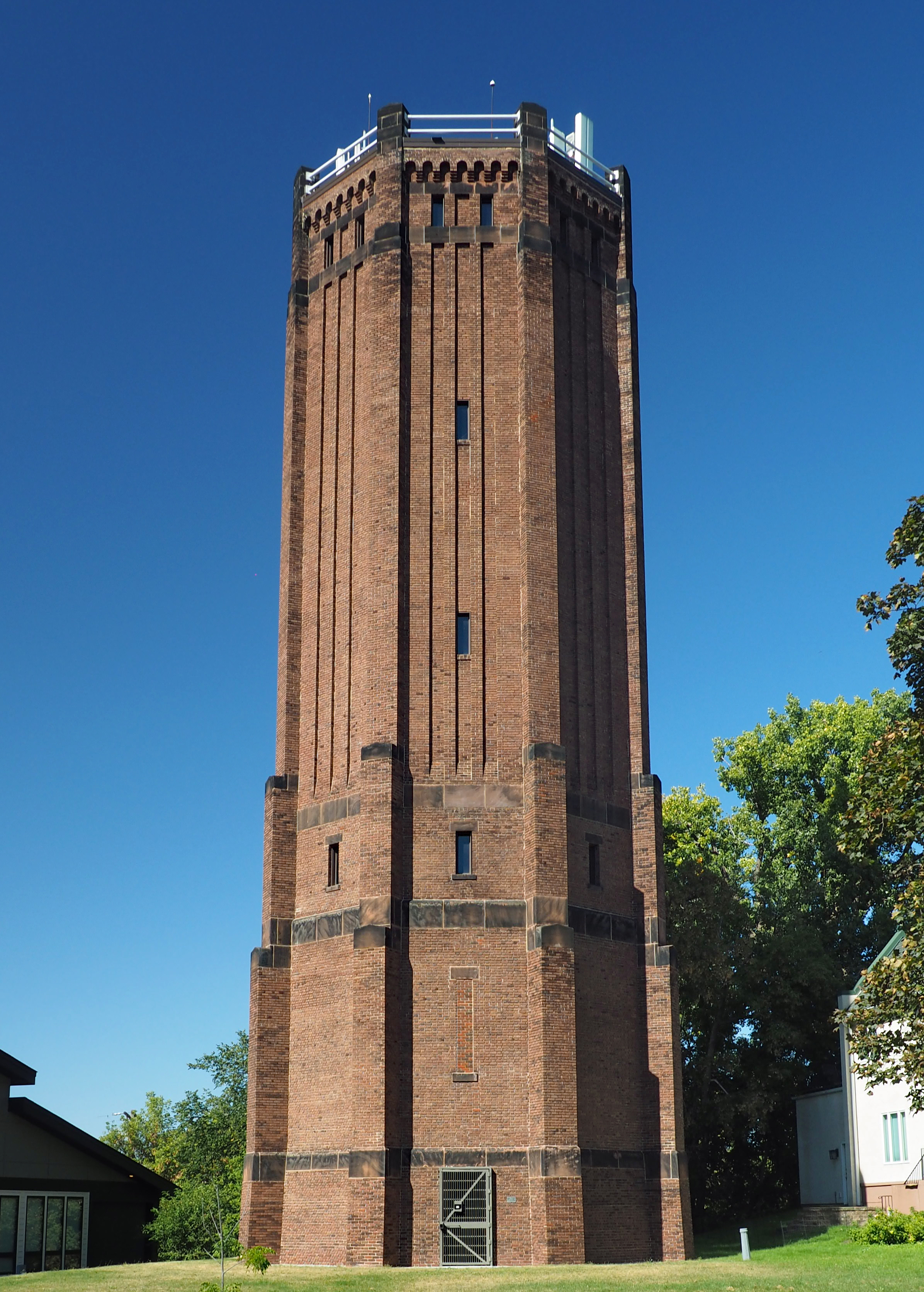
- The Kenwood Park Water Tower in 2024
- Interactive map of the Kenwood Park Water Tower area

General information
- Location: Minneapolis, Minnesota, United States
- Coordinates: 44°58′3″N 93°18′24″W
- Completed: 1910

Design and construction
- Architect: Frederick William Cappelen

The Kenwood Park Water Tower is an octagonal brick and stone water tower in the Kenwood neighborhood of Minneapolis, Minnesota, United States. It was built in 1910 and designed by Frederick William Cappelen, the city of Minneapolis engineer at the time. The tower is 110 feet tall, making it the tallest structure in Kenwood. The tower has not been used to store water since 1954. The tower was built to alleviate water pressure and storage problems in the Lowry Hill area. Although the tower is not the work of a master architect or representative of a specific architectural style, its design is distinctive. It is ornamented with projecting ribs, narrow rectangular windows, and Lombard bands, suggesting a medieval fortress. The tower serves as a distinct visual focus within the neighborhood.

The Kenwood Park Water Tower is one of three stone water towers built in Minneapolis during the early 20th century. The others are Washburn Park Water Tower in Tangletown and Prospect Park Water Tower in Prospect Park.

== Broadcasting ==
=== FM ===
FM radio stations
Frequency	Call sign	Name	Format	Owner
91.9	K220JP (KSJN Translator)	Classical MPR	Classical	Minnesota Public Radio
