= Tower raven =

Tower raven or variation, may refer to:

- Ravens of the Tower of London, a group of ravens that live in the Tower of London (The Tower)
- The Raven Tower (2019 novel), by Ann Leckie
- The Tower of Ravens (2004 novel) in the Rhiannon's Ride series by Kate Forsyth

== See also ==
- Tower (disambiguation)
- Raven (disambiguation)
