= Martin Sigvart Grytbak =

American engineer

Martin Sigvart Grytbak (6 November 1883 – 24 June 1953) was a Norwegian-born American engineer.

Martin Sigvart Grytbak was born in Nedre Stjørdalen Municipality in Nord-Trøndelag county, Norway. He graduated as a civil engineer in 1903 from the Norwegian University of Science and Technology (Norges Teknisk-Naturvitenskapelige Universitet) in Trondheim. Between 1903 and 1905, he worked on an extension of the Hell–Sunnan Line. He emigrated in 1905 to the United States and worked as a bridge engineer for the Northern Pacific Railway in Saint Paul. Together with Kristoffer Olsen Oustad, Andreas W. Munster and Frederick William Cappelen. he became one of four innovative and influential engineers who were involved in the design of the great bridges of the Twin Cities.

From 1913 until after World War II, he served as bridge engineer for Saint Paul Engineer's Office of the City of Saint Paul . Grytbak's major works include the Intercity Bridge (Ford Parkway Bridge) between Saint Paul and Minneapolis as well as the Kellogg Boulevard Viaduct in St. Paul built during 1930, which was recently re-constructed. He died during 1953 in Ramsey County, Minnesota. He was buried at Roselawn Cemetery in Roseville.

== Primary source ==
- Federal Writers' Project The WPA Guide to Minnesota: The North Star State (New York: The Viking Press, 1938. Trinity University Press, 2013) ISBN 9781595342218

== Other sources ==
- Bjork, Kenneth (1947) Saga in Steel and Concrete: Norwegian Engineers in America (Norwegian-American Historical Association)
- Gardner, Denis (2008) Wood, Concrete, Stone, and Steel: Minnesota's Historic Bridges (University of Minnesota Press) ISBN 9780816646661
