= Prospect Park, Minneapolis =

Neighborhood in Minneapolis, Minnesota

Prospect Park
- Neighborhood
- Prospect Park-East River Road
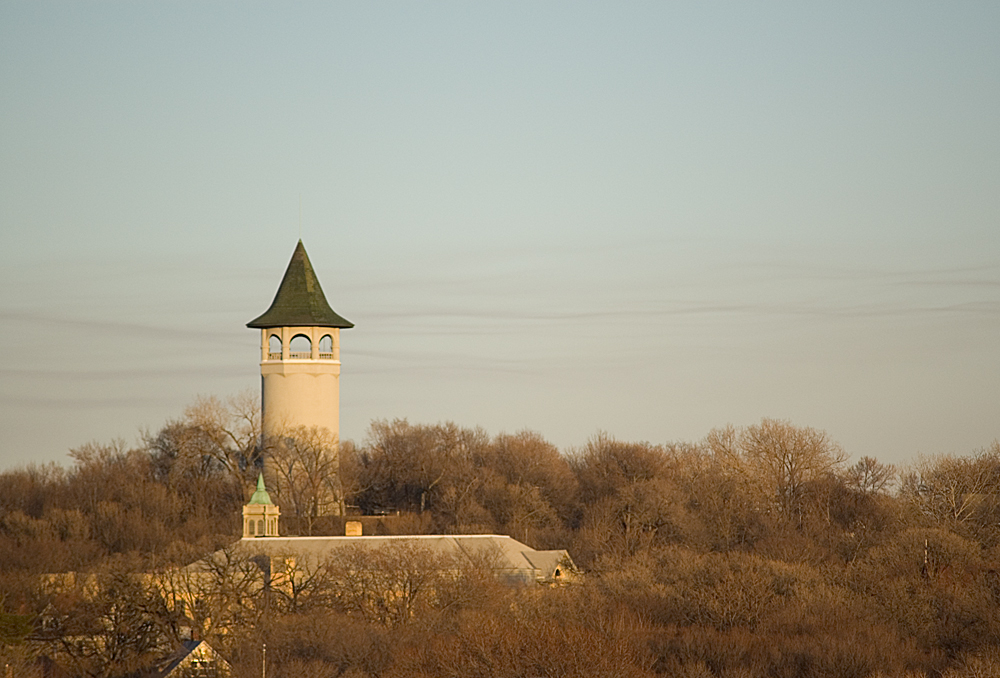
- Prospect Park viewed from Stadium Village, with the conspicuous Prospect Park Water Tower

- Logo
- Nicknames: The Angle, Tower Hill
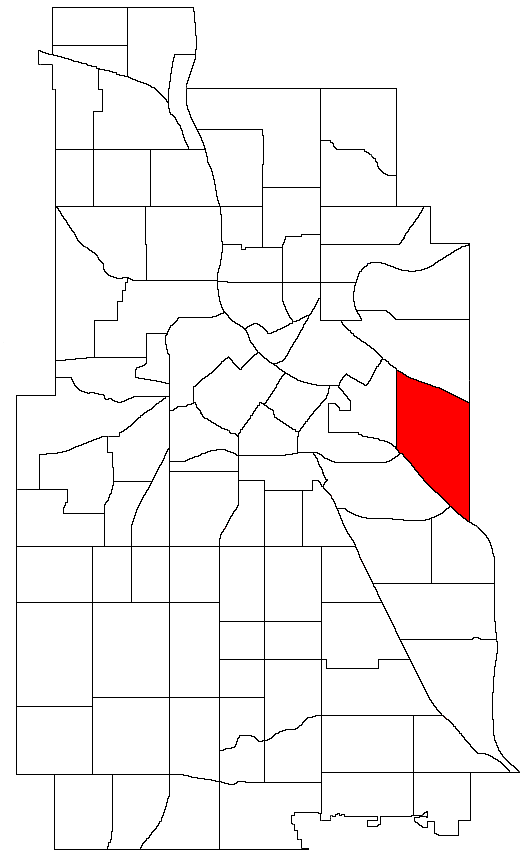
- Location of Prospect Park neighborhood within the U.S. city of Minneapolis
Interactive map of Prospect Park
Prospect Park neighborhood
Prospect Park Residential Historic District
- Country: United States
- State: Minnesota
- County: Hennepin
- City: Minneapolis
- Community: University
- Founded and Platted: 1885
- Founder: Louis Menage
- Named for: Prospect Park (Brooklyn)
- City Council Ward: 2

Government
  - Councilmember: Robin Wonsley

Area
  - Total: 1.275 sq mi (3.30 km^{2})
  - Land: 1.201 sq mi (3.11 km^{2})
  - Water: 0.074 sq mi (0.19 km^{2})
- Elevation: 932 ft (284 m)

Population (2020)
  - Total: 11,354
  - Density: 9,454/sq mi (3,650/km^{2})
- Time zone: UTC-6 (CST)
  - Summer (DST): UTC-5 (CDT)
- ZIP Code: 55414
- Area code: 612
- Website: http://www.pperr.org/

- Prospect Park Residential Historic District
- U.S. National Register of Historic Places
- U.S. Historic district
- Location within Minnesota Location within the United States
- Location: Roughly bounded by University & Williams Avenues SE, Emerald Street SE, and Interstate 94, Minneapolis, Minnesota
- Coordinates: 44°57′58″N 93°12′46″W
- Area: 138 acres (56 ha)
- Built: 1884–1968
- Architect: Samuel Harlan Baker, Joseph H. Gilmore, et al.
- NRHP reference No.: 15000213
- Designated HD: May 12, 2015

Historical population
Census	Pop.	Note	%±
1980	4,964		—
1990	5,074		2.2%
2000	6,326		24.7%
2010	7,457		17.9%
2020	11,354		52.3%

Prospect Park (officially Prospect Park-East River Road) is a historic neighborhood within the University community of the U.S. city of Minneapolis, Minnesota. The area is bounded by the Mississippi River to the south, the City of Saint Paul, Minnesota to the east, the Burlington Northern railroad yard to the north, and the Stadium Village commercial district of the University of Minnesota to the west. The neighborhood is composed of several districts which include the East River Road area. The 1913 Prospect Park Water Tower is a landmark and neighborhood icon.

An urban village once served by streetcar, Prospect Park is now a combination of multiple districts and uses. People live in single-family homes on Tower Hill, as well as apartment housing in the western districts. Estate homes of the early to mid 20th century line East River Road. University Avenue houses a mix of retail and restaurant businesses from the Stadium Village area.

The entire 138-acre (56 ha) core of the neighborhood was listed on the National Register of Historic Places in 2015 as the Prospect Park Residential Historic District for its significance in the theme of social history. It was nominated for its cohesive community spirit, developed—despite the neighborhood's hilly terrain and diverse housing stock—through such innovations as Minneapolis's first community association.

== History ==
In 1874 real estate tycoon Louis F. Menage began plotting new subdivisions along Minneapolis's southern boundaries. Menage petitioned the City Council to accept his Prospect Park plats in 1884. Construction lasted into the 1910s as topography and geographic isolation made building difficult. Houses were designed in the popular architectural styles of the period, especially the Queen Anne and the Colonial Revival styles. The Minneapolis Board of Education constructed the Sidney Pratt Elementary School in 1898.

Thomas Lowry's interurban commuter train served the neighborhood with its stop at Malcolm Avenue until eventually the intercity line between Saint Paul and Minneapolis along University Avenue was opened. The Franklin Avenue Bridge also eventually carried a line.

1909 Racial Conflict

“Race War Started in Prospect Park.” Minneapolis Star Tribune, October 22, 1909. In 1908, a black couple, Madison and Amy Woods Jackson moved into their new brick home in Minneapolis’s Prospect Park neighborhood. They had three young daughters: Marvel, Helen and Zelma.

At the advice of his friend and fellow Pullman Porter Madison Jackson, William H. Simpson had decided to establish a home in the same middle-class neighborhood. Both Jackson and Simpson were African American. Neighbors grumbled when Jackson had moved his family into the all white neighborhood.

On October 21, 1909, a crowd of over one hundred residents marched to the Jackson residence, where Simpson was staying to oversee the construction of his new house. There, they delivered an unequivocal message to Simpson: Members of his race were not welcome in Prospect Park.

== Tower Hill ==
Tower Hill (established 1906), which is the site of the Prospect Park Water Tower, is often cited as the city's highest point and a placard denotes the highest elevation at 951 feet (289.86 m), but a spot at 974 feet (296.88 m) in or near Deming Heights Park in Northeast Minneapolis is corroborated by Google Earth as the highest ground. The Tower, designed by Frederick William Cappelen, is listed on the National Register of Historic Places. The top of the water tower is accessible once a year to the public so long as they have the cone of ice cream in their hand upon entry.

== SEMI District ==
The SouthEast Industrial Area (SEMI) in the north contains light manufacturing, rail yards and remnant grain silos. Many plans for redeveloping the land have been created, including proposals from the nearby University of Minnesota. Starting in the early 2000s, Wall Companies purchased land in the surrounding SEMI District with plans of creating a technology and research campus, with the goal of attracting businesses that wanted proximity to the University of Minnesota. After failing to bring this idea to fruition, a different proposal to create a food hall out of the neighboring Harris Machinery Building, taking advantage of the nearby Green Line and U of M Transitway was implemented. The food hall, named Malcom Yards, was opened to the public in August 2021.

A prominent structure in the SEMI is the ADM-Delmer #4 grain elevator locally known for its United Crushers graffiti on its side. It was originally constructed as a part of the ADM-Delmer facility, named after its owner the Archer-Daniels-Miller company, which started construction in 1925 and ended in 1931. The site was made up of 4 grain elevators. After its abandonment, elevators #2 and #3 where demolished. During the early 2000's, the local graffiti crew United Crushers tagged the southern wall of the elevator.

== Demographics ==
The neighborhood is demographically diverse. Tower Hill extending south to the river contains families and retired empty-nesters. The Glendale Housing project southeast of 27th Avenue SE and University Avenue SE contains 700 families with the average household income slightly above $9,000 and 32% of residents living at or below the poverty level. On the former industrial areas of the west and north are newer student housing apartment buildings for both undergraduate and graduate students. As of 2020, Prospect Park is the third largest neighborhood in Minneapolis by population.

Race/ethnicity
Race/ethnicity	2000		2010		2020	
Race/ethnicity	Number	%	Number	%	Number	%
White alone	4,762	75.28	5,147	69.02	5,944	52.35
Black alone	481	7.60	700	9.39	1,245	10.97
Hispanic or Latino (any race)	155	2.45	176	2.36	494	4.35
Native American alone	65	1.03	42	0.56	32	0.28
Asian alone	619	9.78	1,196	16.04	3,067	27.01
Other race alone	13	0.21	20	0.27	40	0.35
Pacific Islander alone	13	0.21	2	0.03	8	0.07
Two or more races	218	3.45	174	2.33	524	4.62
Total	6,326	100.0	7,457	100.0	11,354	100.0

== Government ==
Prospect Park is entirely within Minneapolis's ward 2 and state legislative district 60B. The neighborhood association, PPERRIA, founded in 1901, is the oldest neighborhood association in the city of Minneapolis.

== Arts and culture ==
The neighborhood has an annual "Ice Cream Social," a get-together for the neighborhood with food, music and other entertainment. It is the one time of year when the interior of the Prospect Park Water Tower is opened to the public, allowing for a panoramic view of Minneapolis from the top.

Near the south end of the neighborhood on Bedford Street is the Malcolm Willey House, designed by Frank Lloyd Wright and named after a University administrator. The historic significance of the house played a large part in preventing its destruction when Interstate 94 was built in the 1950s. The current goal of the neighborhood is to establish an "urban-village" feel — that is, a somewhat self-contained feel in the context of a larger city. Prospect Park also has a few surviving houses from the 19th century.

The neighborhood is home to two community centers, Pratt Elementary School and Luxton Park.

== Gallery ==
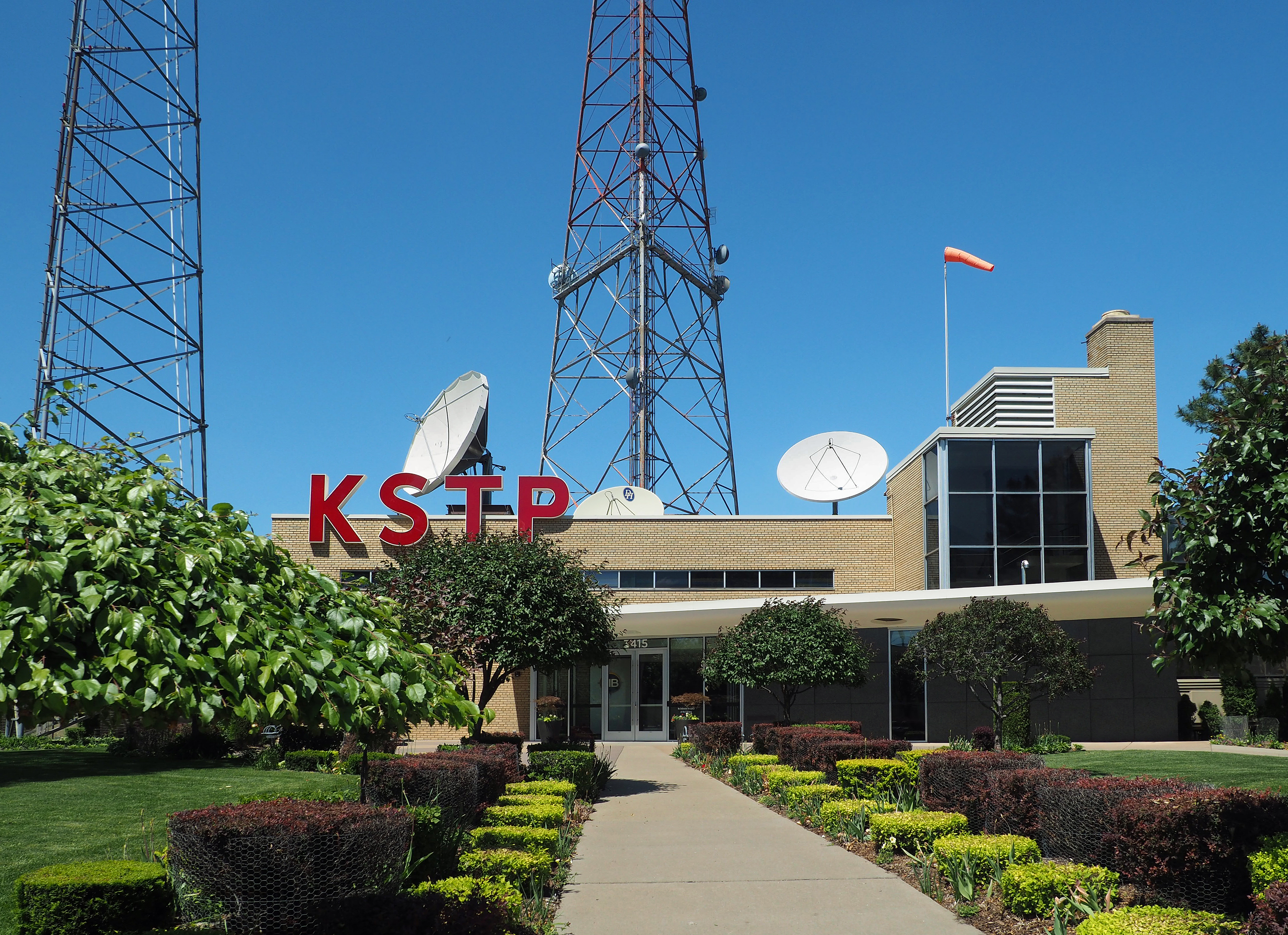
Entrance to the KSTP-AM-FM-TV studios on University Avenue. The sidewalk leading to the building lies precisely on the city line, as does the central leg of the tower.

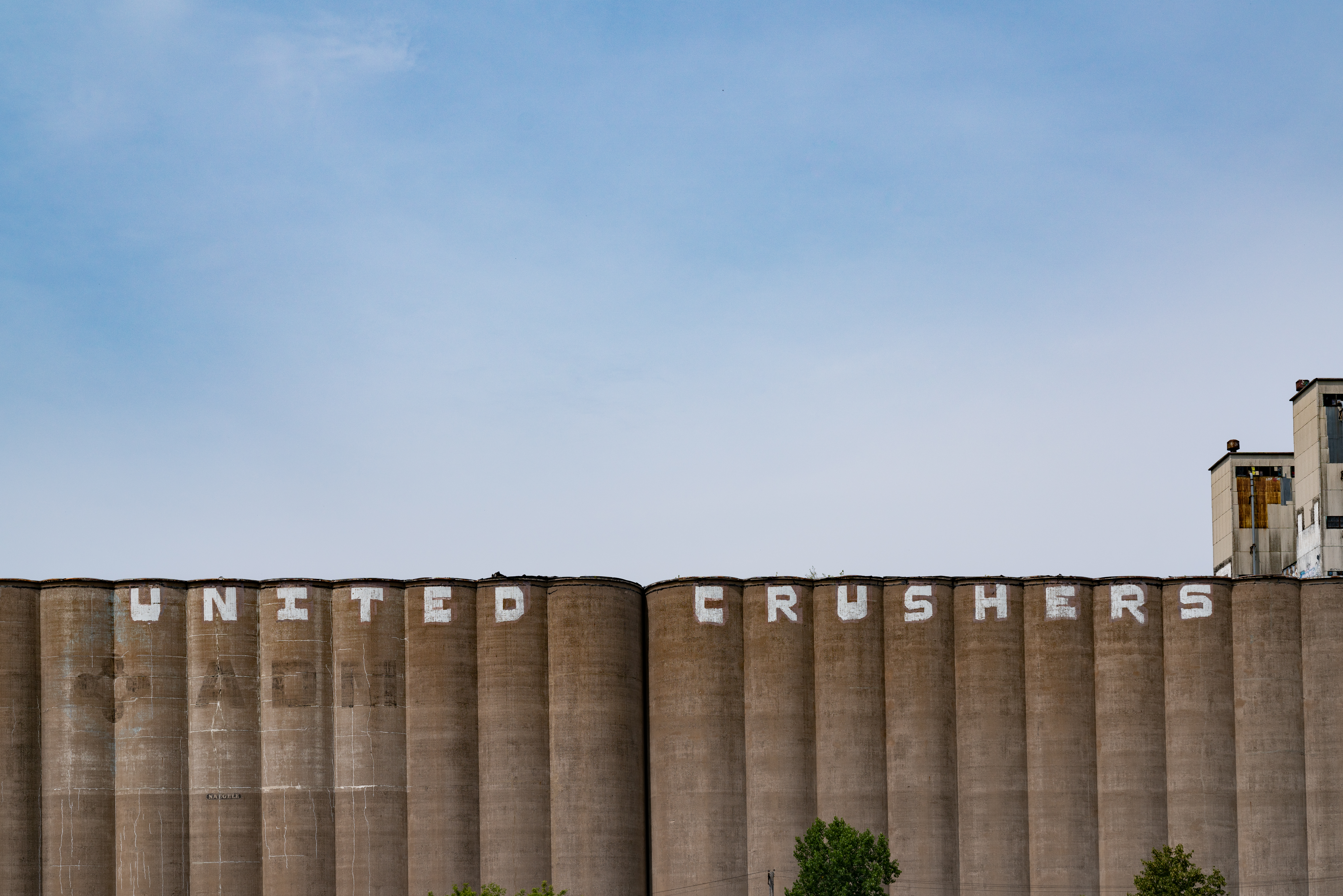
ADM-Delmer #4

== See also ==
- National Register of Historic Places listings in Hennepin County, Minnesota
- Neighborhoods of Minneapolis
- University community of Minneapolis
