= St. Anthony Falls Bridge =

St. Anthony Falls Bridge may refer to several bridges that cross the Mississippi River near St. Anthony Falls in Minneapolis:

- Third Avenue Bridge (Minneapolis), opened 1918
- I-35W Mississippi River bridge, 1967–2007
- I-35W Saint Anthony Falls Bridge, opened 2008

== See also ==
- Stone Arch Bridge (Minneapolis), located at the falls, between the bridges listed above
