= 10th Avenue Bridge =

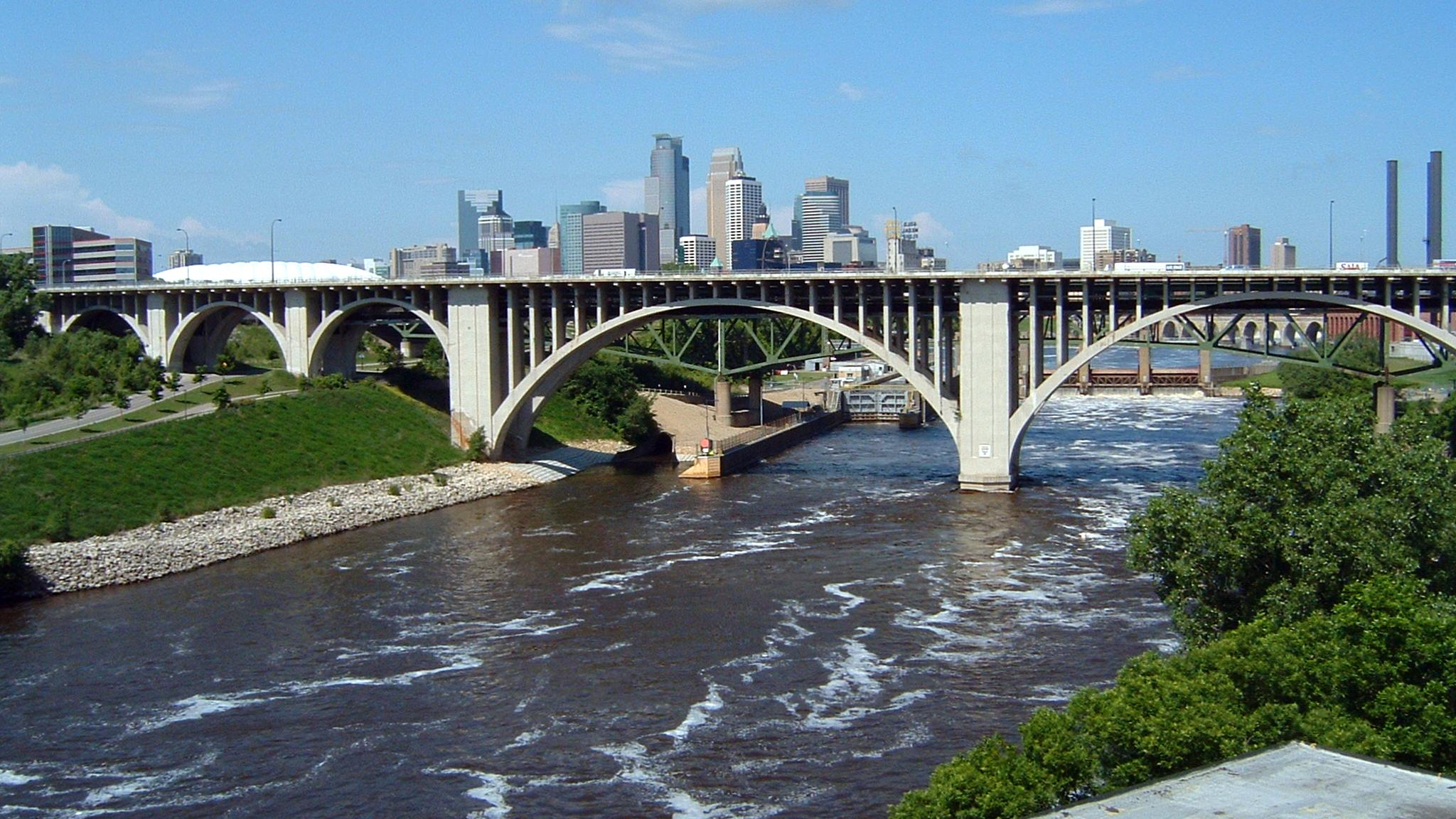
- The 10th Avenue Bridge in Minneapolis
- Coordinates: 44.9784°N 93.2438°W
- Carries: Two lanes of automobile traffic Two-lane bikeway
- Crosses: Mississippi River
- Locale: Minneapolis, Minnesota
- Official name: Minnesota Senate Majority Leader Kari Dziedzic Memorial Bridge
- Maintained by: Minneapolis
- ID number: 2796

Characteristics
- Design: Concrete rib deck-arch bridge
- Total length: 2,175 feet (663 m)
- Width: 68 feet (21 m)
- Longest span: 266 feet (81 m)
- Clearance below: 101 feet (31 m)

History
- Opened: 1929

Location
- Interactive map of 10th Avenue Bridge

The 10th Avenue Bridge crosses the Mississippi River near downtown Minneapolis, Minnesota and also in proximity to the University of Minnesota. The bridge was historically referred to as the Cedar Avenue Bridge in the days prior to the construction of the I-35W Mississippi River bridge when it connected to Cedar Ave. The bridge connects 10th Avenue Southeast, on the east side of the Mississippi River, to 19th Avenue South on the west side. The Seven Corners area of the Cedar-Riverside, Minneapolis neighborhood is at the southern end of the bridge. The downstream end of the lower Saint Anthony Falls lock and dam extends under the bridge. The historic Southeast Steam Plant is also located nearby.

The bridge is considered the crowning achievement of Minneapolis city engineer Kristoffer Olsen Oustad, one of four prominent Norwegian-American men who designed major structures in the region.

In April 2025, the Minnesota Senate unanimously agreed to dedicate the bridge in honor of deceased Minnesota Senate Majority Leader Kari Dziedzic. It was officially dedicated to Dziedzic during a ceremony on October 1 2025.

== History ==
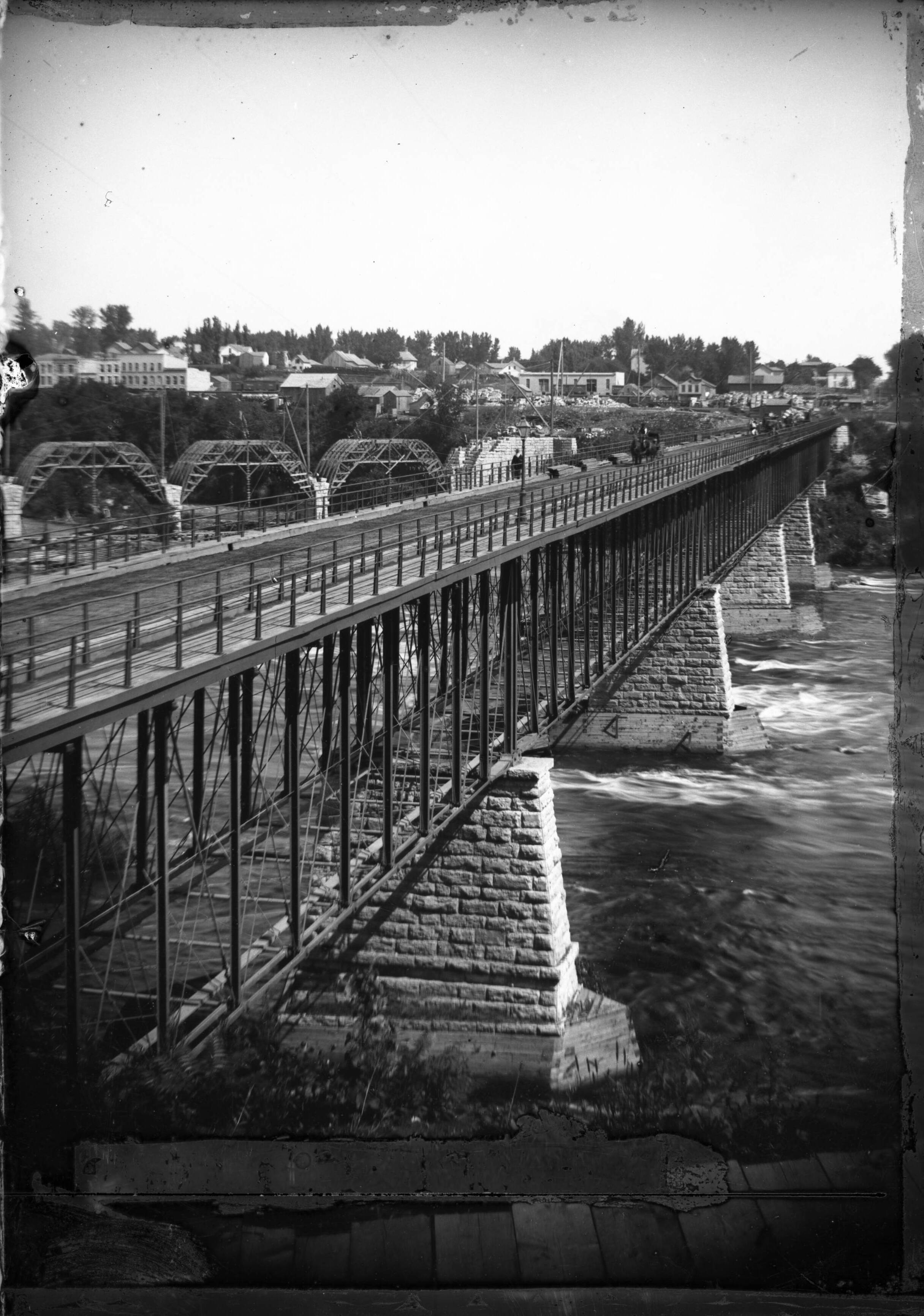
Old 10th Avenue Bridge seen from the west side, 1880s.

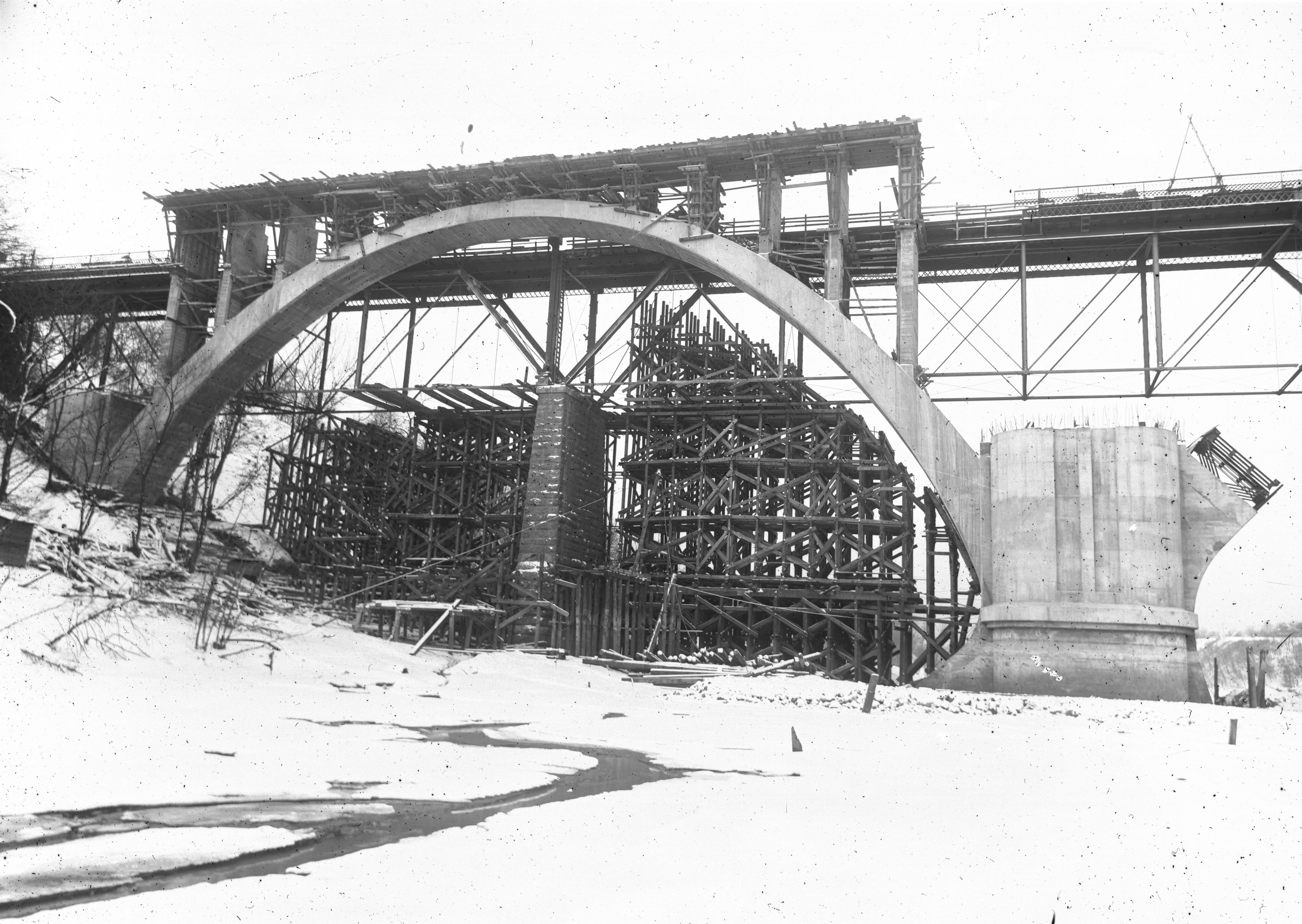
10th Avenue Bridge under construction in 1927.

A bridge known as the "10th Avenue Bridge" was built upstream from the current bridge in 1874. That bridge extended from 10th Avenue South in downtown Minneapolis to 6th Avenue Southeast. It also was known as the "Tenth Avenue wagon bridge". The piers still are visible upstream from the current I-35W Mississippi River bridge. That bridge was demolished in 1943 to provide scrap for the World War II war effort.

Construction on the current bridge began in 1926, and it was completed in 1929. It was built to alleviate the traffic flows on the bridges serving downtown. The total length is 2,174.9 feet (662.9 m), with two central spans each 265.5 feet (80.9 m) across. It has an open spandrel arch design, and it is constructed of reinforced concrete. Higher and longer than any preceding bridge in the region, it was originally 2,921 feet (890 m) in overall length, 698 feet (213 m) longer than the nearby Third Avenue Bridge. It stands 110 feet (34 m) above the water's surface. The budgeted cost of the bridge in 1922 was US$943,209.71. For many years it was the river crossing for Minnesota State Highway 36.

A major restoration was undertaken in 1972–1976, and the approach spans were altered (they were not considered architecturally significant, even when the bridge was new). The south approach span was relocated to go straight to Washington Avenue.

The bridge was added to the National Register of Historic Places in 1989.

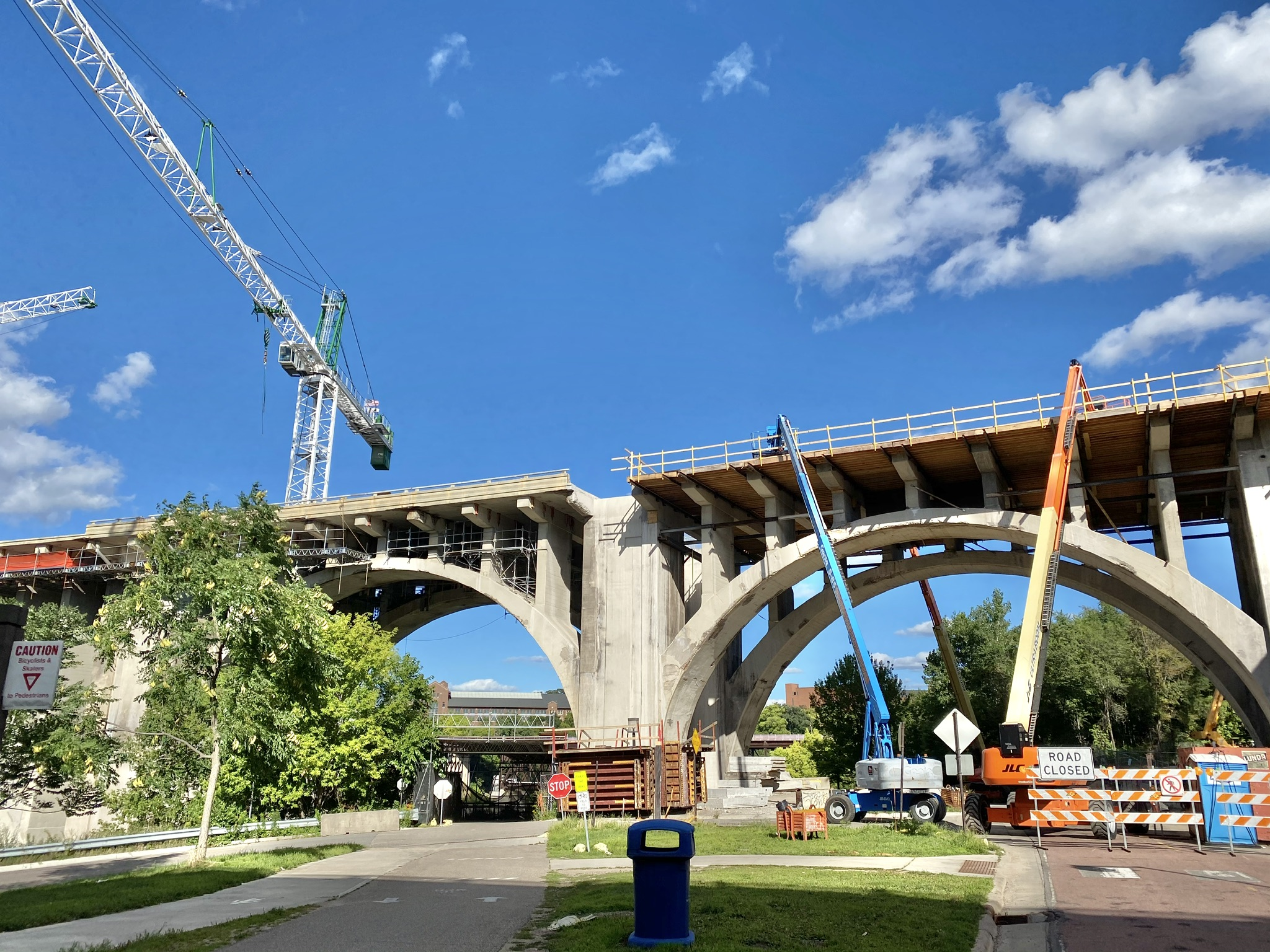
Bridge repair work in 2020.

Roads in the vicinity were disrupted by the construction of Interstate 35W and a corresponding bridge (completed 1967; collapsed in 2007) one to two blocks upstream. During the days immediately following the I-35W bridge collapse, the 10th Avenue Bridge was closed to traffic, then later reopened; it was one of the most used locations from which to view the wreckage and the recovery efforts.

The bridge was reported to be deteriorating in 2015. It was closed in 2020 to replace the bridge deck and other deteriorating concrete components. It re-opened to traffic and pedestrians in November 2021.

== Gallery ==
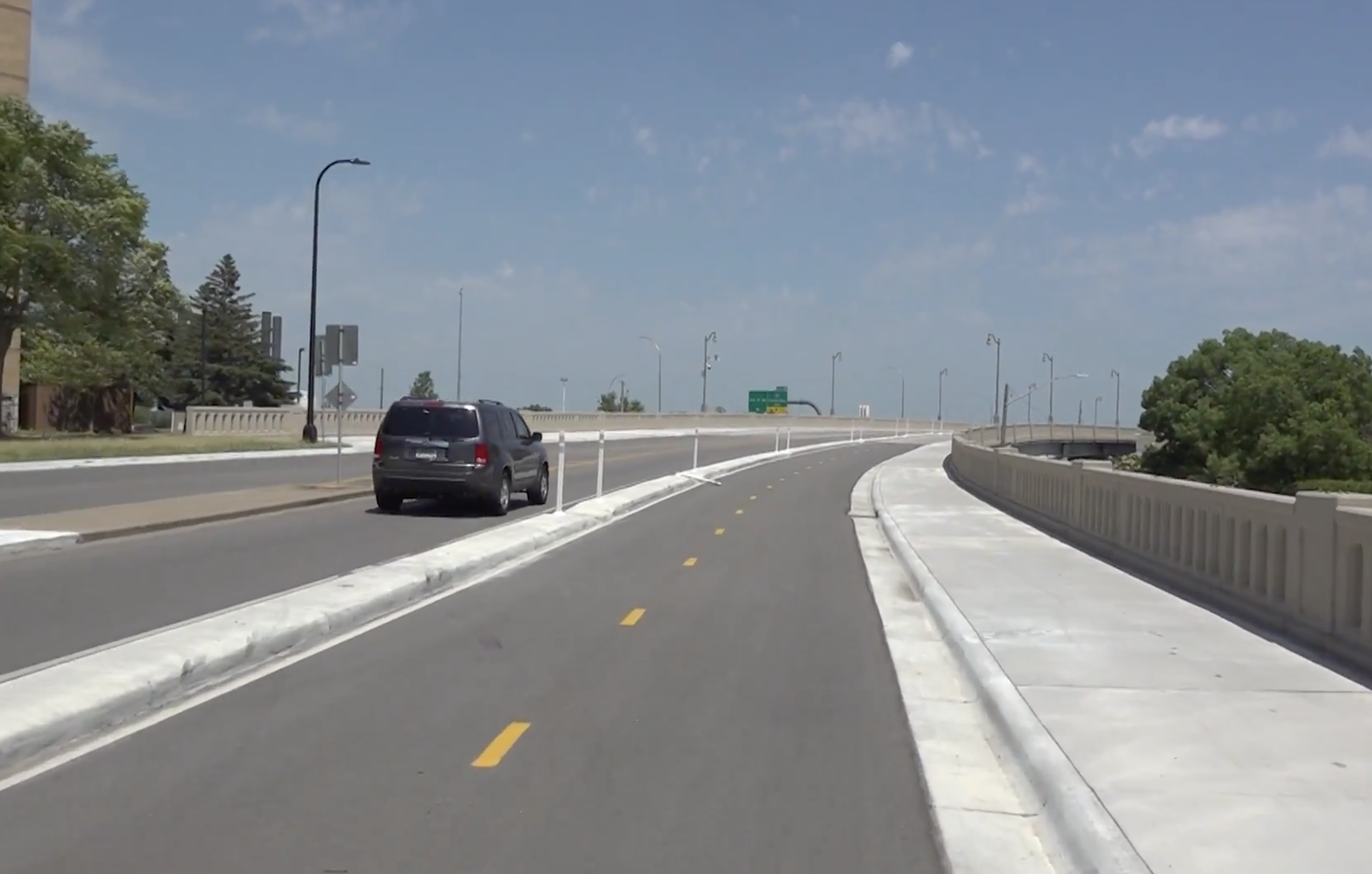
Resurfaced 10th Ave Bridge with protected bike lane

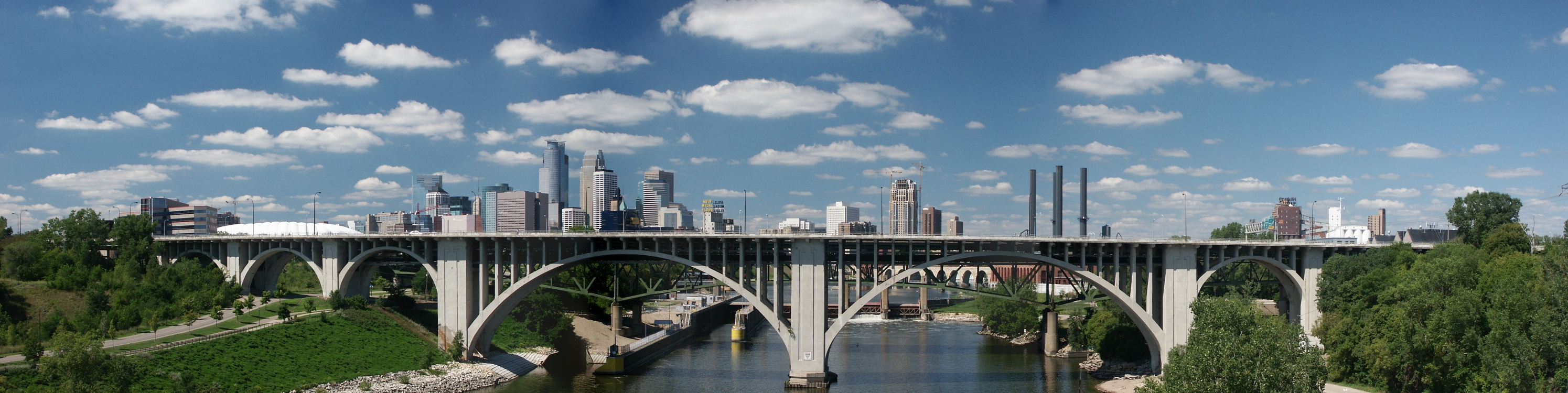
Panorama of the 10th Avenue Bridge, looking northwest

== See also ==
- List of crossings of the Upper Mississippi River
- I-35W Mississippi River bridge
