= Telecommunications Tower =

Telecommunications Tower may refer to:

- Telecommunications tower, a mast or tower built primarily to hold telecommunications antennas
- Telecommunications Tower (Montevideo), or Antel tower, in Uruguay
- Telecommunication Tower of US-Forces Heidelberg, in Germany
- Telecom Telecommunication Tower Heidelberg, in Germany
- Bungsberg telecommunications tower, in Germany
- Lohmar-Birk telecommunications tower, in Germany

== See also ==
- Telekom Tower, in Kuala Lumpur, Malaysia
- Montjuïc Communications Tower, in Spain
- Liberation Tower (Kuwait), originally intended to be named The Kuwait Telecommunications Tower
- Pasilan linkkitorni, or Yle Transmission Tower, in Finland
