= Skyscraper (disambiguation) =

A skyscraper is a very tall, continuously habitable building.

Skyscraper or Sky Scraper may also refer to:

== Arts and entertainment ==
=== Films ===
- Skyscrapers (film), a 1906 American silent film
- Skyscraper (1928 film), an American silent drama movie
- Skyscraper (1959 film), an American short film directed by Shirley Clarke and Willard Van Dyke
- Skyscraper (1996 film), a direct-to-video movie starring Anna Nicole Smith
- Skyscraper (2011 film), a Danish drama movie
- Skyscraper (2018 film), an American action film

=== Music ===
- Skyscraper (band), a UK rock band
- Skyscraper World Tour by Joker Xue, 2018-2019

==== Albums ====
- Skyscraper (album) or the title song, by David Lee Roth, 1988
- Skyscraper (soundtrack), from the 2018 film
- Skyscraper, by Tall Stories, 2009

==== Songs ====
- "Skyscraper" (song), by Demi Lovato, 2011; covered by Sam Bailey, 2013
- Skyscrapers (song), by Joker Xue from Freak, 2018
- "Skyscraper", by Bad Religion from Recipe for Hate, 1993
- "Skyscraper", by the Boo Radleys from Everything's Alright Forever, 1992
- "Skyscraper", by NCT 127 from Ay-Yo, 2023
- "Skyscraper", by Newsted from Metal, 2013
- "Skyscraper", by Train from For Me, It's You, 2006
- "Skyscrapers", by OK Go from Of the Blue Colour of the Sky, 2010

=== Other arts and entertainment ===
- Skyscraper (magazine), an independent quarterly music magazine
- Skyscraper (musical), a 1966 Tony Award-nominated musical
- Skyscraper (play), a 1997 off-Broadway comedy play by David Auburn
- Skyscraper, a 1984 novel by Robert Byrne

== Science and technology ==
- Skyscraper sheaf, a mathematical object
- Skyscraper, a variety of sunflower
- Skyscraper, a type of web banner used for online advertising
- Skyscraper, a type of triangular Moonraker (sail)

== Sport ==
- Skyscraper (horse), winner of the 1789 Epsom Derby
- The Skyscrapers, World Championship Wrestling tag team
- Stefan Struve (born 1988), Dutch mixed martial arts fighter, nickname Skyscraper

== Structures ==
- Nebotičnik, Slovenian for "skyscraper", in Ljubljana, Slovenia
- Sky Scraper (Ferris wheel), at Lagoon Amusement Park, Farmington, Utah, US
- Skyscraper (roller coaster), Cancelled roller coaster at the SkyPlex complex in Orlando, Florida, US

== Other uses ==
- Skyscraper! Achievement and Impact, an exhibit at the Liberty Science Center, New Jersey, US
- Skyscraper, a PS2 first person shooter developed by Atomic Planet Entertainment
- A battle course in Mario Kart 64
- Skyscraper Mountain a mountain in Washington state
- Skyscraper Mountain (Alaska), a mountain in Alaska

== See also ==
- Sky Scrapper, a rollercoaster at World Joyland in Wujin, Changzhou, Jiangsu, China
