= The Towers =

The Towers can refer to:

In Australia

- The Towers, Kilmore, a heritage-listed house in Melbourne, Victoria
- The Towers, Lilydale, a heritage-listed house in Melbourne, Victoria

In Canada

- The Towers (Canada), a mountain on the Continental Divide and on the border of British Columbia and Alberta in the Canadian Rockies

In Ireland

- The Towers Pub, demolished pub in Ballymun, Ireland

In the United Kingdom

- The Towers (Manchester), a 20th-century research facility
- The Towers, Scarborough, house in North Yorkshire
- The Towers (Sheffield), a small country house in Sheffield

In the United States

- The Towers (Atlantic Highlands, New Jersey), on the National Register of Historic Places (NRHP)
- The Towers (Narragansett, Rhode Island), on the NRHP
- The Towers (Newport News, Virginia), a public housing project
- The Towers (Ohio State), twin towers used a dormitories on the main campus of Ohio State University

== See also ==
- The Tower (disambiguation)
- Tower (disambiguation) (includes "Towers")
