= Franklin Avenue Bridge =

Bridge in Minneapolis, Minnesota

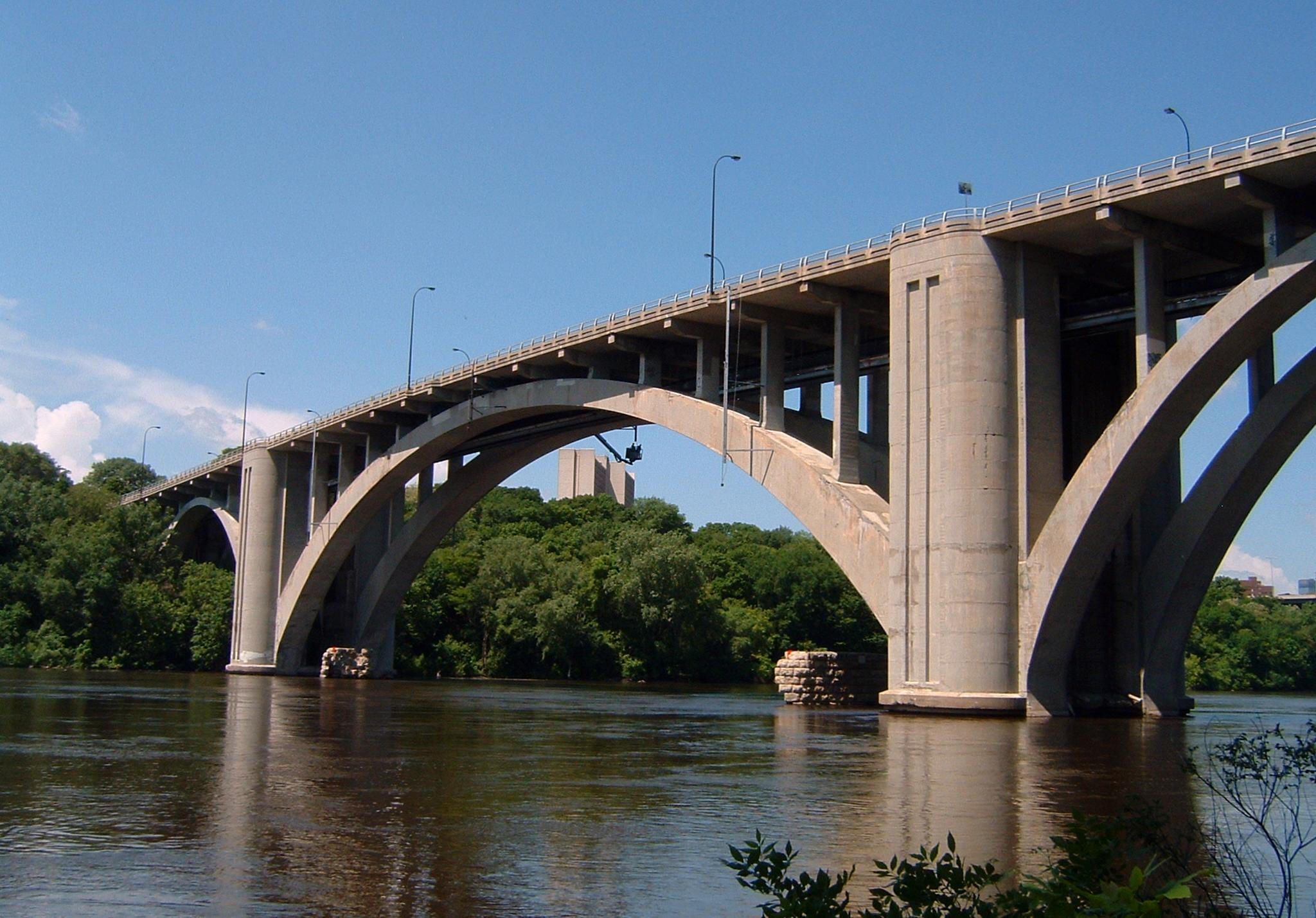
- Franklin Avenue Bridge spanning the Mississippi River
- Coordinates: 44°57′50″N 93°13′22″W
- Carries: CSAH 5 (Franklin Avenue)
- Crosses: Mississippi River
- Locale: Minneapolis, Minnesota
- Official name: F.W. Cappelen Memorial Bridge
- ID number: 2441

Characteristics
- Design: Concrete Arch
- Total length: 1,054.7 ft (321.5 m)
- Longest span: 400 feet
- Cappelen Memorial Bridge
- U.S. National Register of Historic Places
- Minneapolis Landmark
- Location within Minnesota
- Location: Franklin Ave. and Mississippi River, Minneapolis, Minnesota
- Area: 1.6 acres (0.65 ha)
- Built: 1919
- Architect: Frederick William Cappelen; Kristoffer Olsen Oustad
- Architectural style: Parabolic-arch bridge
- NRHP reference No.: 78001537

Significant dates
- Added to NRHP: November 28, 1978
- Designated MPLSL: 1985

Location
- Interactive map of Franklin Avenue Bridge

The Franklin Avenue Bridge, officially the F.W. Cappelen Memorial Bridge, carries Franklin Avenue over the Mississippi River in Minneapolis, Minnesota. It was designed by Frederick William Cappelen, assisted by Kristoffer Olsen Oustad, both of whom were among four important Norwegian-American engineers working in the region at the time. The reinforced-concrete open-spandrel arched structure was completed in 1923. The bridge's overall length is 1054.7 feet (321.47 m), with a central span of 400 feet (122 m). It was added to the National Register of Historic Places in 1978 along with several other area bridges as part of a multiple-property submission. At the time of its completion, the bridge's central span was the longest concrete arch in the world.

The bridge originally carried streetcars, which were removed in the 1940s. A major renovation in the early 1970s changed many of the ornamental details and widened a completely replaced deck. A bike lane was added in 2005. The bridge was extensively rehabilitated between 2015 and 2017, including restoring some of the details lost in the 1970s reconstruction

The bridge's designer, Frederick William Cappelen, was also responsible for the design of many public works buildings in Minneapolis, such as the Prospect Park Water Tower and the Kenwood Park Water Tower. Cappelen died during the construction of the bridge on February 16, 1921 following an operation for appendicitis. As a memorial to his life and career, the city council decided immediately after Cappelen's death to name the bridge in his honor.
