= Tower City =

Tower City may refer to:

- Tower City, Pennsylvania
- Tower City, North Dakota
- Tower City Center, a retail, office, and transportation complex in downtown Cleveland, Ohio
  - Tower City station
