= Lohmar-Birk telecommunications tower =

Coordinates: 50.8288°N 7.2803°E

The Telecommunication Tower Lohmar-Birk is a 134-meter-high (440 ft) telecommunication tower built of reinforced concrete located in Lohmar, North Rhine-Westphalia, Germany. The Telecommunication Tower Lohmar-Birk serves as transmission tower for mobile phone services, directional radio services and as amateur radio relay.

== See also ==
List of towers
