= Skyscraper (soundtrack) =

Skyscraper – Original Motion Picture Soundtrack

Film score by Steve Jablonsky
- Released: July 13, 2018 (Digital); August 3, 2018 (Physical)
- Recorded: April 2018
- Studios: Abbey Road Studios, London
- Genre: Film Score
- Length: 74:00
- Label: Milan Records
- Producers: Steve Jablonsky; David Metzner; Ron Webb

Steve Jablonsky chronology
Game Over, Man! (2018)	Skyscraper – Original Motion Picture Soundtrack (2018)	Spenser Confidential (2020)

Skyscraper – Original Motion Picture Soundtrack is the film score to the 2018 film of the same name, written and composed by Steve Jablonsky. The score was recorded at Abbey Road Studios in London with an orchestra conducted by Alastair King. Additional mixing was done at Arata Music Studios. The soundtrack was digitally released on July 13, 2018 by Milan Records with the physical soundtrack being released later on August 3, 2018.

== Background ==
Steve Jablonsky was hired to score the film, replacing Thurber's frequent composer, Theodore Shapiro.

For the basis of the score, Jablonsky worked with traditional orchestra and blended looped guitar riffs which consisted of both acoustic and electric. He did this to make the film more realistic and gritty, avoiding the notion of a hero-esque theme. As for the character of Botha, Jablonsky discarded the use of an orchestra to represent the villain. So, he came up with a "unique percussion rhythm" by recording "tom-toms through several distortion pedals and a compressor." which Thurber liked a lot.

Luke Richards, Christian Wibe and Bryce Jacobs provided additional music.

== Track listing ==
All music is composed by Steve Jablonsky except where noted.

No.	Title	Length
1.	"Hostage, Pt. 1"	7:29
2.	"Will & Sarah"	3:56
3.	"Welcome to Heaven"	2:40
4.	"Botha"	3:22
5.	"The Crane"	7:06
6.	"Chopper Ambush"	2:54
7.	"Duct Tape"	2:38
8.	"Bridge Collapse"	3:10
9.	"Proper Motivation"	3:44
10.	"Out on a Ledge"	4:27
11.	"Georgia & Henry"	2:52
12.	"Reflections"	5:25
13.	"Hostage, Pt.2"	1:56
14.	"Reboot"	2:19
15.	"Lucky Man"	5:07
16.	"Skyscraper"	5:00
17.	"The Pearl"	5:38
18.	"Walls (performed by Jamie N Commons)"	3:55
Total length:		74:00

Track 18, Walls by Jamie N Commons, is played during the end credits of the film. A further track from the end credits, Break in the Clouds by Frightened Rabbit, is not included in the soundtrack album.

== Personnel ==
- Original Score Composed & Produced- Steve Jablonsky
- Music Supervisors — Peter Afterman & Magaret Yen
- Associate Music Supervisor — Alison Litton
- Music Coordinator — Oriana Pedone
- Mixing Engineer — Jeff Biggers
- Recording Engineer — Andrew Dudman
- Orchestra Leader — Everton Nelson
- Solo Cello — Tim Gill
- Guitars — Tom Strahle, Steve Jablonsky & Bryce Jacobs
- Drums — Jon Jablonsky
- Technical Score Engineer — Lori Castro
- Orchestra Conducted - Alastair King
- Orchestrators — Larry Rench & Jeremy Borum
- Librarian — Jill Streater
- Assistant Engineers — Matt Jones & George Oulton
