= Tower Theatre =

Tower Theatre or Tower Theater may refer to:

- Tower Theater, Philadelphia 1975, an album by Bruce Springsteen and the E Street Band
- Tower Theatre Company, London
- Tower Theatre (Bend, Oregon)
- Tower Theatre (Folkestone), Kent
- Tower Theatre (Fresno, California)
- Tower Theatre (Los Angeles)
- Tower Theater (Miami, Florida)
- Tower Theater (Pennsylvania)
- Tower Theatre (Sacramento, California)
- Tower Theatre (Salt Lake City)

== See also ==
- The Tower, Melbourne, a flexible performance space in the Malthouse Theatre
- Tower Theatre Company
