= Third Avenue Bridge (Minneapolis) =

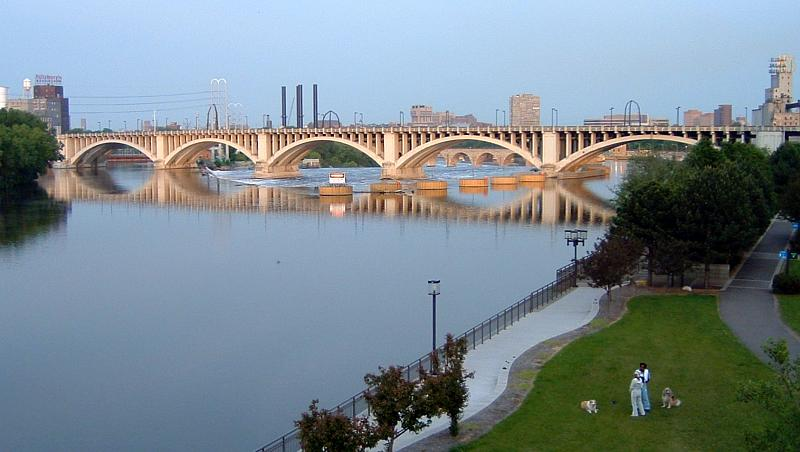
- Third Avenue Bridge spanning the Mississippi, viewed from the northwest.
- Coordinates: 44°59′00″N 93°15′32″W
- Carries: Four lanes of MN 65
- Crosses: Mississippi River
- Locale: Minneapolis, Minnesota, United States
- Maintained by: Minnesota Department of Transportation
- ID number: 2440

Characteristics
- Design: Open-spandrel concrete arch bridge
- Total length: 2,223 ft (678 m)
- Width: 54 ft (16 m)
- Longest span: 211 feet
- Clearance below: 42 feet

History
- Opened: 1918
- Third Avenue Bridge
- U.S. Historic district – Contributing property
- Location within Minnesota Location within the United States
- Built: 1914-1918
- Architectural style: Melan arch bridge, open spandrel
- Part of: St. Anthony Falls Historic District (ID71000438)

Significant dates
- Added to NRHP: July 25, 2024
- Designated CP: March 11, 1971

Location
- Interactive map of Third Avenue Bridge

The Third Avenue Bridge is a landmark structure of the city of Minneapolis, Minnesota, United States, originally known as the St. Anthony Falls Bridge. It carries road traffic across the Mississippi River and upper fringes of Saint Anthony Falls. The multi-arched bridge meets with Third Avenue in downtown Minneapolis at its south end, but curves as it crosses the river, and connects with Central Avenue on its north end. The shallow "S" curve in the bridge was built to avoid fractures in the limestone bedrock that supports the bridge piers. The road is also designated Minnesota State Highway 65. Construction began in 1914, and it opened four years later in 1918. The bridge, which uses Melan arches of an open spandrel design, has been modified since that time. The 2,223-foot (667.6 m) crossing was designed by city engineer Frederick W. Cappelen, who also created plans for other similar bridges in Minneapolis such as the Franklin Avenue Bridge. It cost US$862,254.00 at the time of construction.

== Renovation ==
The bridge underwent a major overhaul in 1979–1980. The bridge underwent another restoration in 2020–2023 to extend its life 50 years with a new deck, and other improvements to barriers, railings, and lighting. As the bridge is individually listed on the National Register of Historic Places, and is a contributing member of the St. Anthony Falls Historic District, a goal of the project is preserving its historic design elements. The construction project began in May 2020 with partial closure of the bridge, and was fully closed to traffic on January 4, 2021. The bridge was originally anticipated to reopen November 2022 but was delayed. The bridge reopened on October 28, 2023.

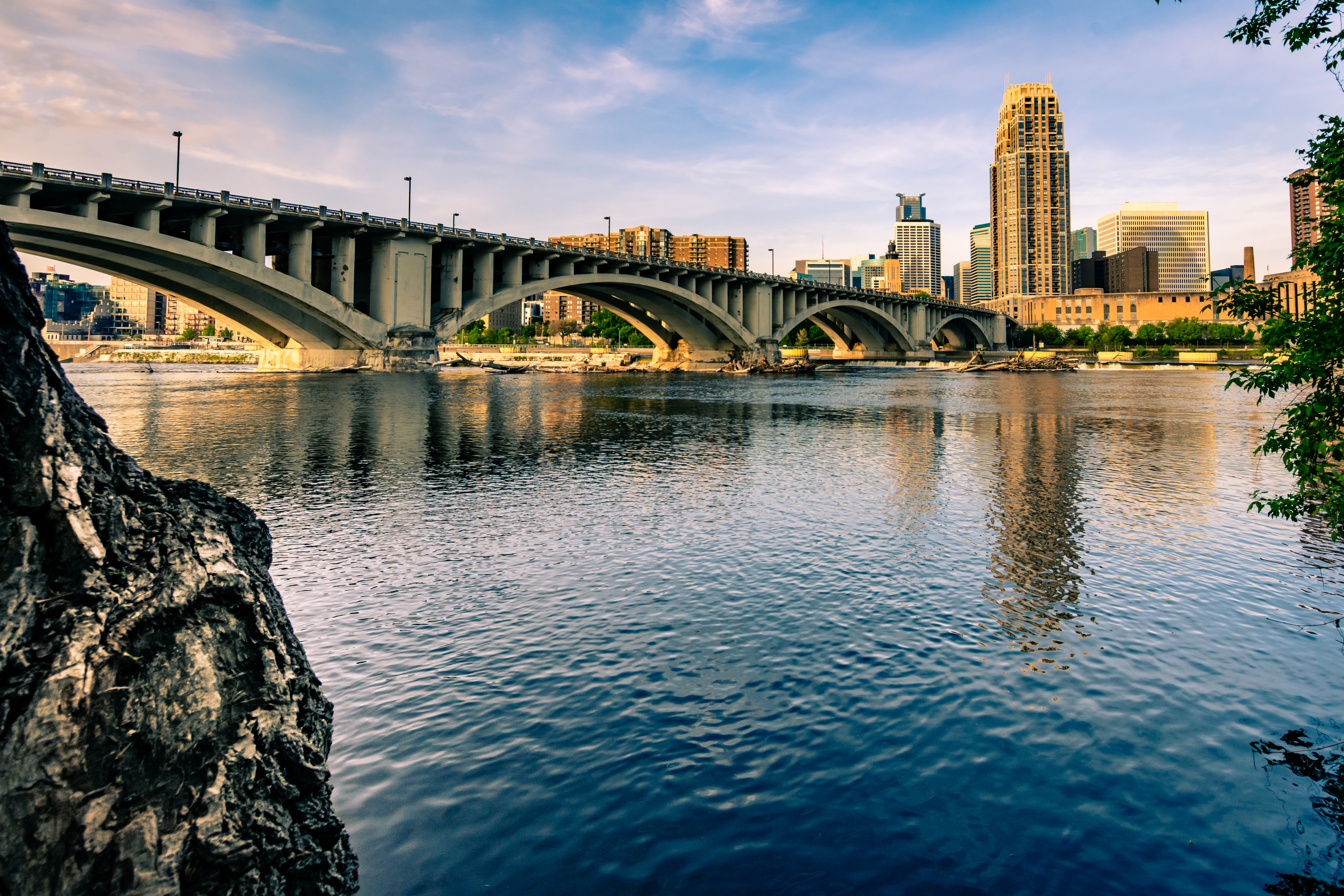
3rd Avenue Bridge crossing the Mississippi River into downtown Minneapolis.

== See also ==
- List of crossings of the Upper Mississippi River
