= Prospect Park Water Tower =

Historic water tower

- Prospect Park Water Tower and Tower Hill Park
- U.S. National Register of Historic Places
- U.S. Historic district – Contributing property
- Minneapolis Landmark
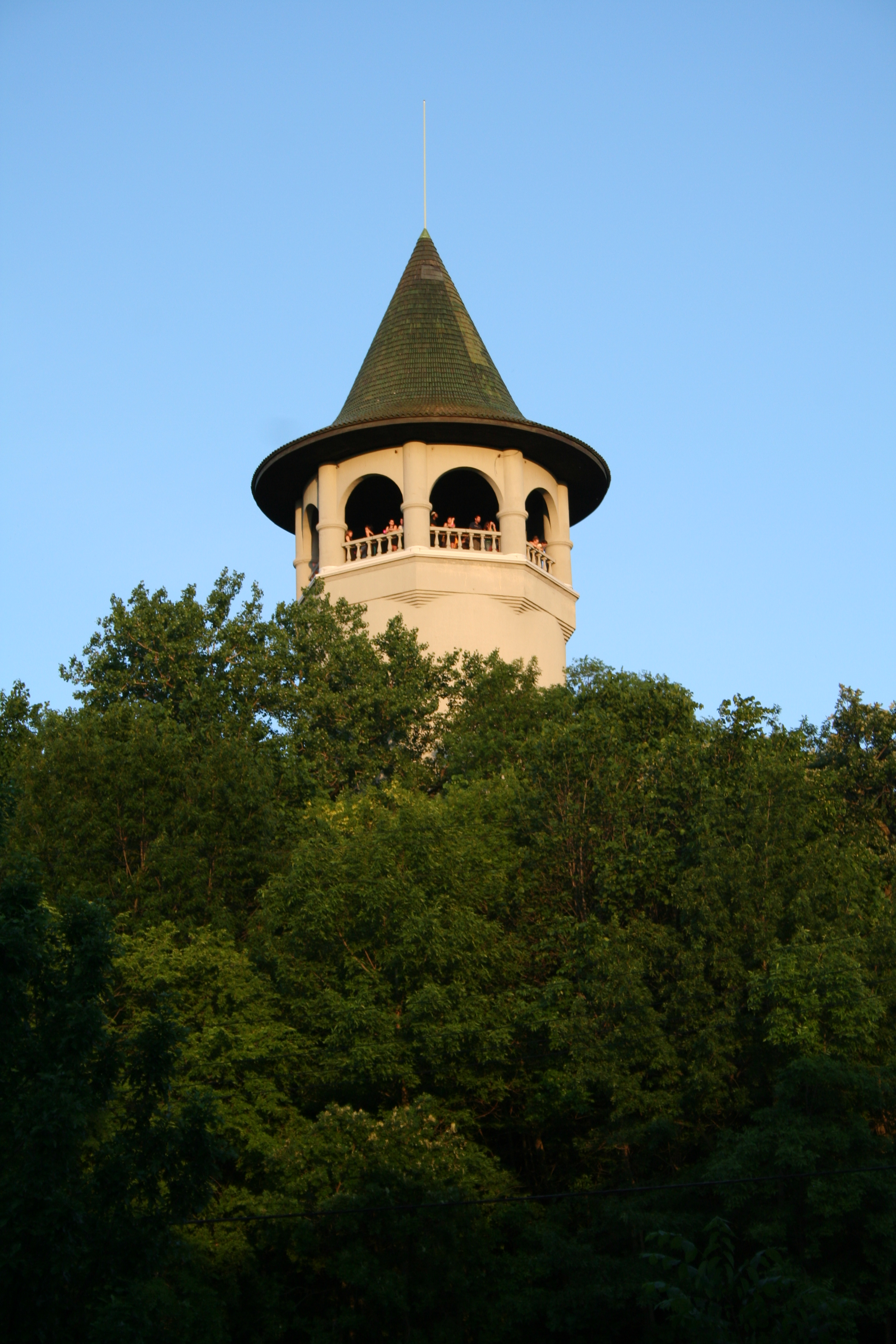
- The Prospect Park Water Tower overlooking Tower Hill Park in 2006

- Location within Minnesota Location within the United States
- Location: 55 Malcolm Avenue SE, Minneapolis, Minnesota
- Coordinates: 44°58′7″N 93°12′46″W
- Area: 4.7 acres (1.9 ha)
- Built: 1906 (park), 1913 (water tower)
- Architect: Frederick William Cappelen
- Architectural style: Late-19th and 20th Century Revivals
- Part of: Prospect Park Residential Historic District (ID15000213)
- NRHP reference No.: 97001426

Significant dates
- Added to NRHP: November 13, 1997
- Designated CP: May 12, 2015
- Designated MPLSL: 1984

The Prospect Park Water Tower – sometimes referred to as the Witch's Hat – is a historic water tower in the Prospect Park neighborhood of Southeast Minneapolis, Minnesota, United States. It was built in 1913-1914 on Tower Hill Park, a hilltop park established in 1906. The water tower has become the neighborhood's architectural mascot for its singular design by Frederick William Cappelen. The tower is purported to be the inspiration for Bob Dylan's song "All Along the Watchtower," as the tower was clearly visible from Dylan's home in nearby Dinkytown. Standing at nearly 1,000 feet above sea level, the tower has the distinction of occupying one of the highest spots in the Twin Cities. With its thick concrete shaft, open-air belvedere, and steeply pitched, green-tile roof, the water tower looms over a small pump house on the northwest edge of the park, a set of tennis courts on the southwest side of the park, and the curvilinear streets of the adjacent neighborhood.

The park and water tower were listed on the National Register of Historic Places in 1997 for having local significance in the themes of architecture, community planning and development, and engineering.. They were nominated for their associations with city planning, urban infrastructure, architectural eclecticism, and the work of architect Frederick William Cappelen. In 2015 they were also listed as contributing properties to the Prospect Park Residential Historic District.

== Tower Hill Park ==
Tower Hill Park marks the northern boundary of Prospect Park, a hilly residential neighborhood in southeast Minneapolis. The 4.7-acre city park is bounded on the northeast by University Avenue, the east by Clarence Avenue, the south by Seymour Avenue, the southwest by Orlin Avenue, and the northwest by Malcolm Avenue. With the exception of University Avenue, quiet, residential streets surround Tower Hill Park. Much of the upper portion of Tower Hill Park is heavily wooded, gradually giving way to a grass lawn as the elevation lowers.

== History ==
Erected in 1913 on Tower Hill, one of the highest points in Minneapolis, the tower was built to increase water pressure in the area and thereby enhance firefighting efforts. The functional structure, however, was given a whimsical appearance by city engineer Frederick William Cappelen. To the delight of generations of Minnesotans to come, he topped the building with a fanciful brimmed "hat" of green ceramic tile, and hence its nickname was born.

Tower Hill and the Prospect Park neighborhood have enjoyed a love affair of sorts over the years. From the beginning, the tower and surrounding parkland attracted neighbors, young and old, who picnicked under shade trees in summer and sledded down the hill's icy slopes in winter. The tower's observation deck provided views of the Minneapolis and St. Paul skylines, and the building itself inspired many artists who captured its one-of-a-kind profile in charcoal and watercolor. More than once over the years it has also galvanized neighborhood pride and determination on its own behalf.

The Prospect Park Water Tower ceased to function as a water tower in 1952, but it remained an esteemed neighborhood symbol. In 1955, when the city announced plans to demolish the tower following a lightning strike, the community mobilized. "Spurred on by eleven members of the Prospect Park Blue Birds (a junior organization of the Campfire Girls)," neighbors fought city hall and saved their tower.

Since the late 20th century, the observation deck is open only one day a year, which is celebrated with an ice-cream social.

The observation deck was last opened for a Doors Open Days in Minneapolis in 2019. During the event, a step on the internal staircase broke, which has resulted in the observation deck not reopening as of 2023. A study commissioned by the city of Minneapolis estimated the costs it would take to reopen the building from $50,000 to $1.3 million depending on the scope of repairs and rehabilitation.

== Gallery ==
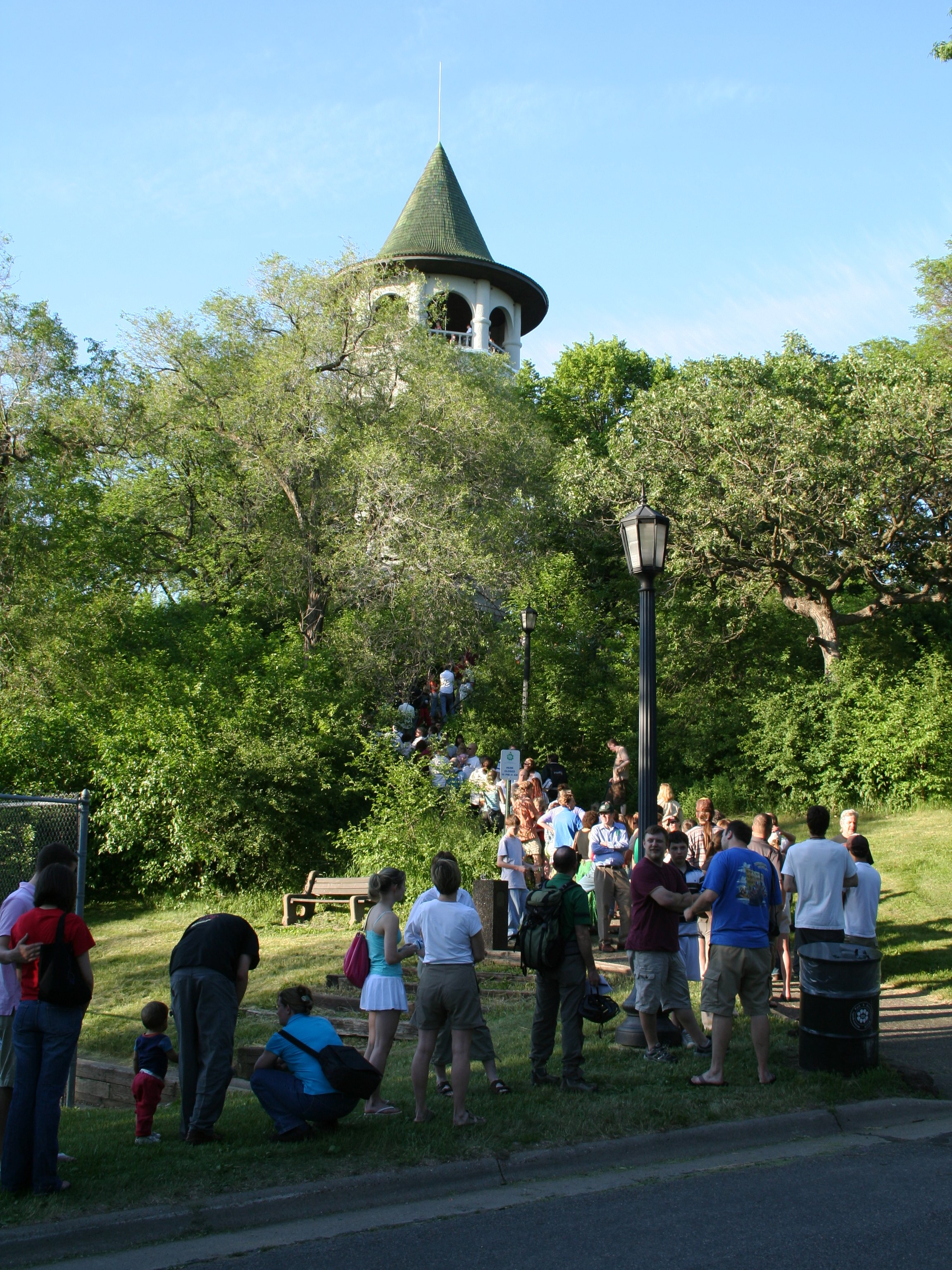
Line to Witch's Hat Tower

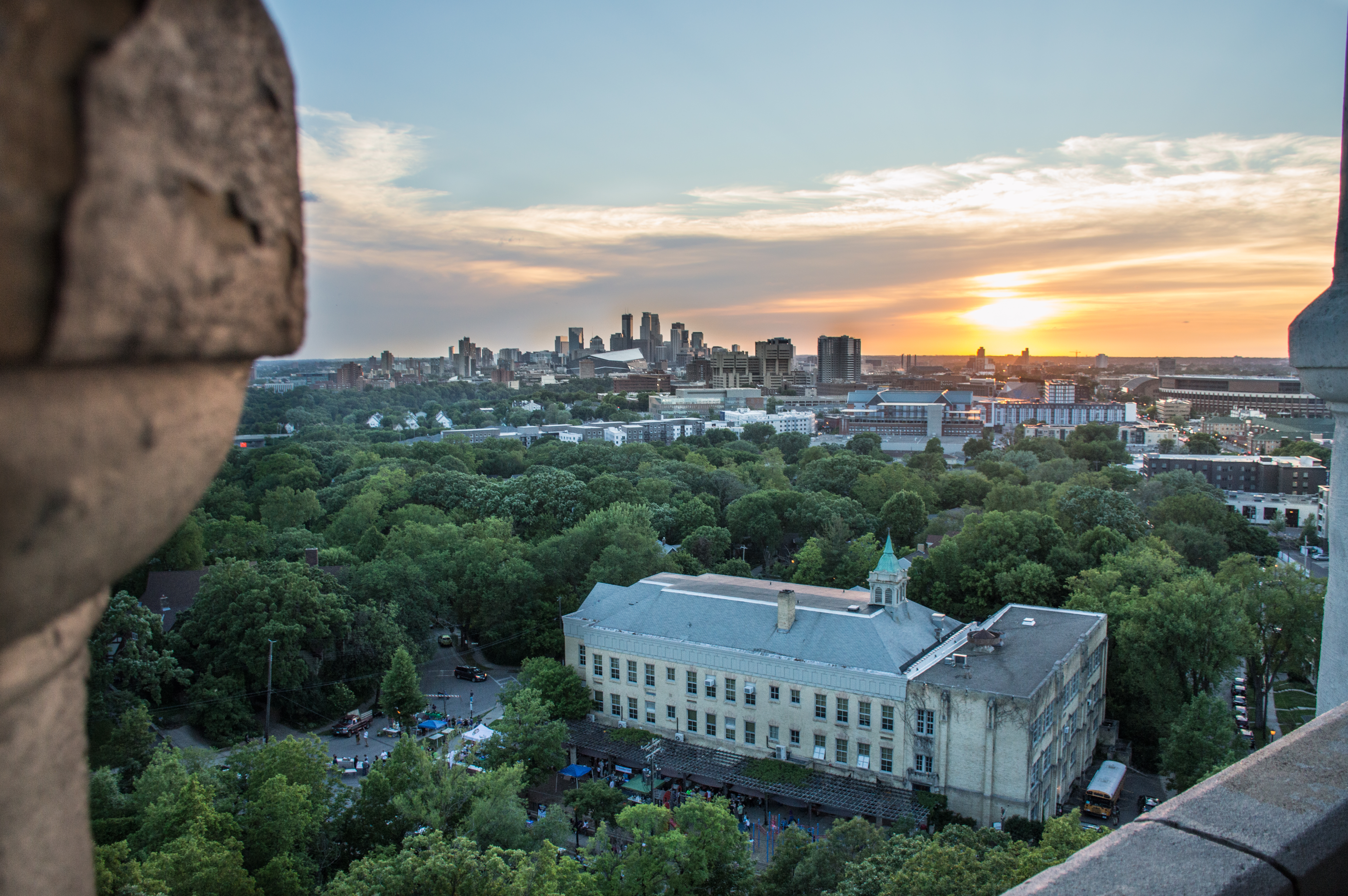
Minneapolis from the Witches Hat Water Tower

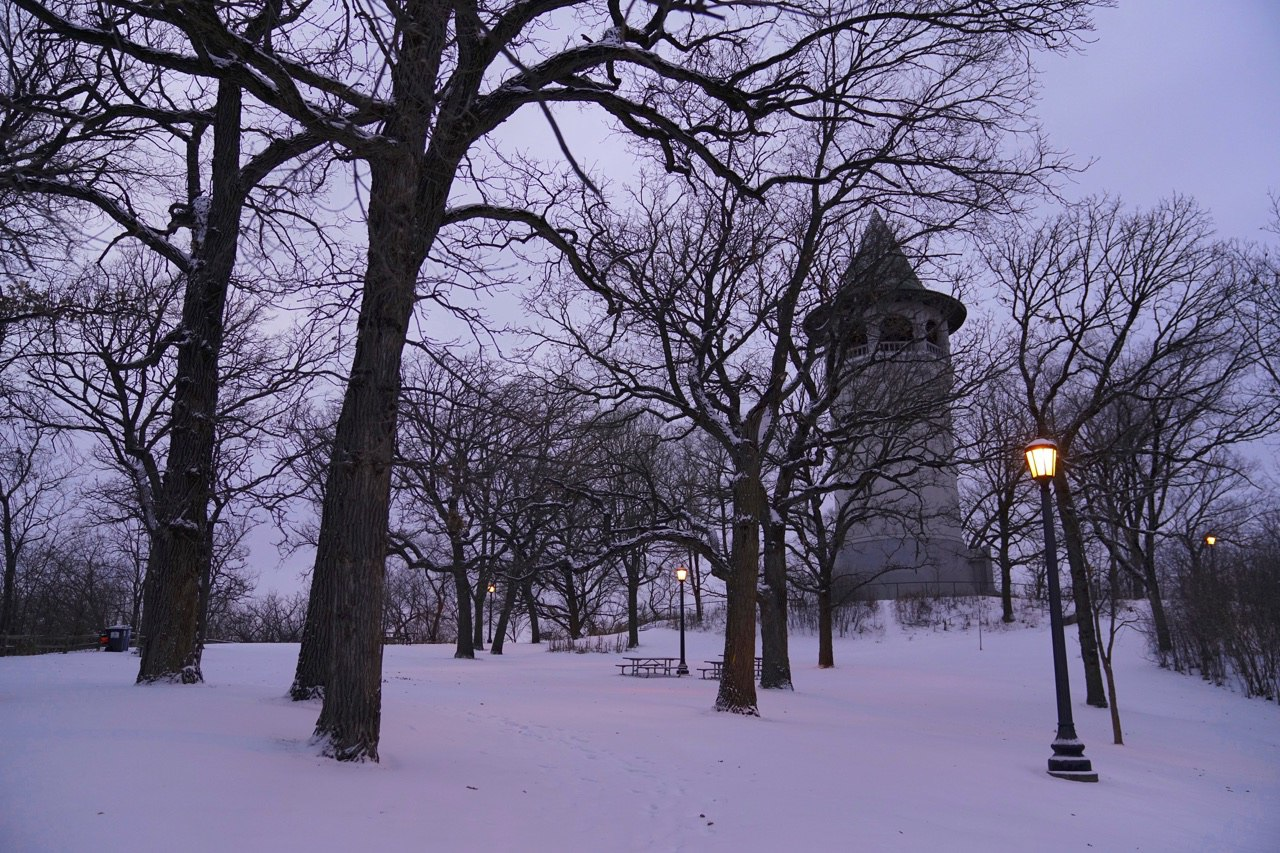
Witch's Hat during winter

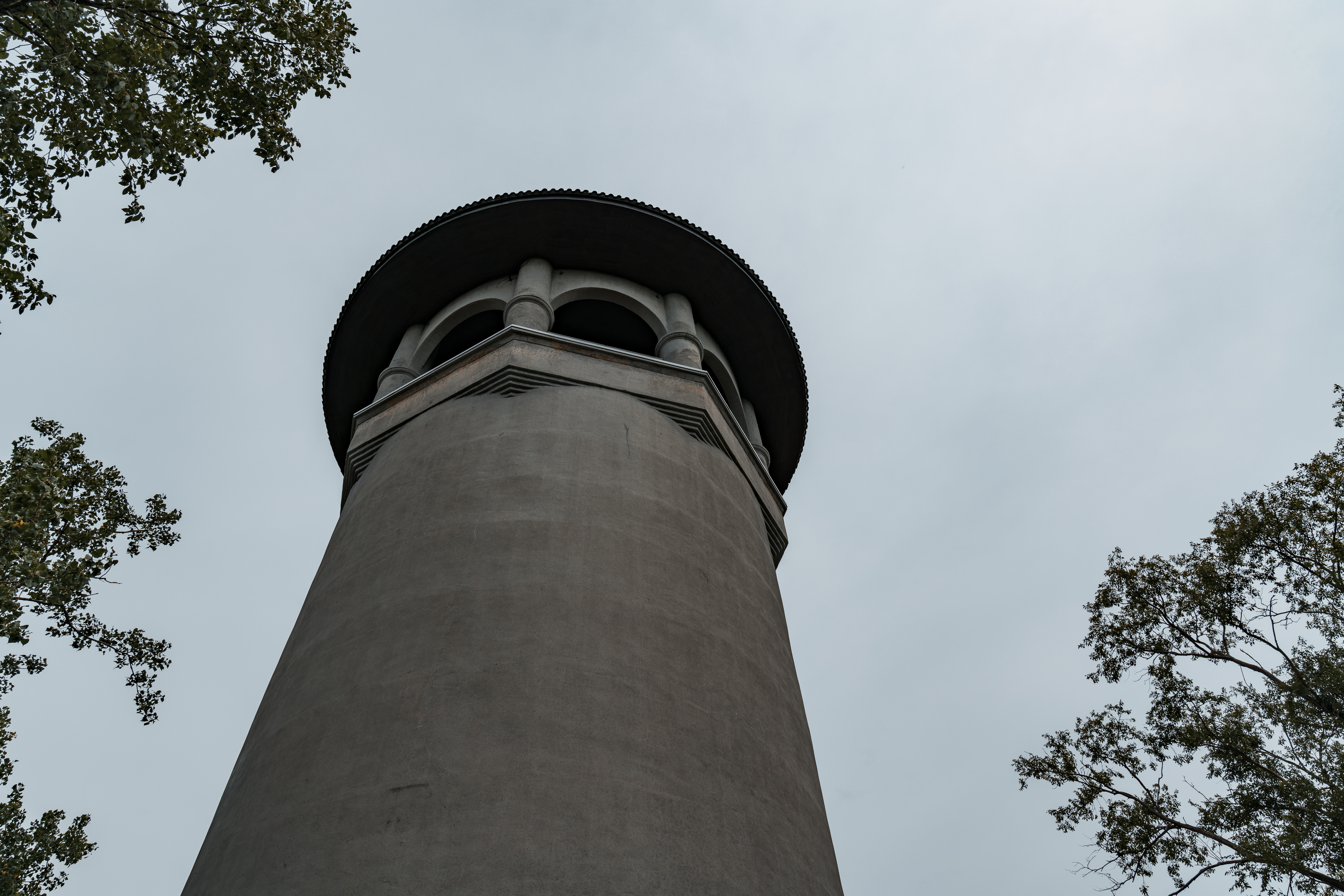
Angled view of Witch's Hat

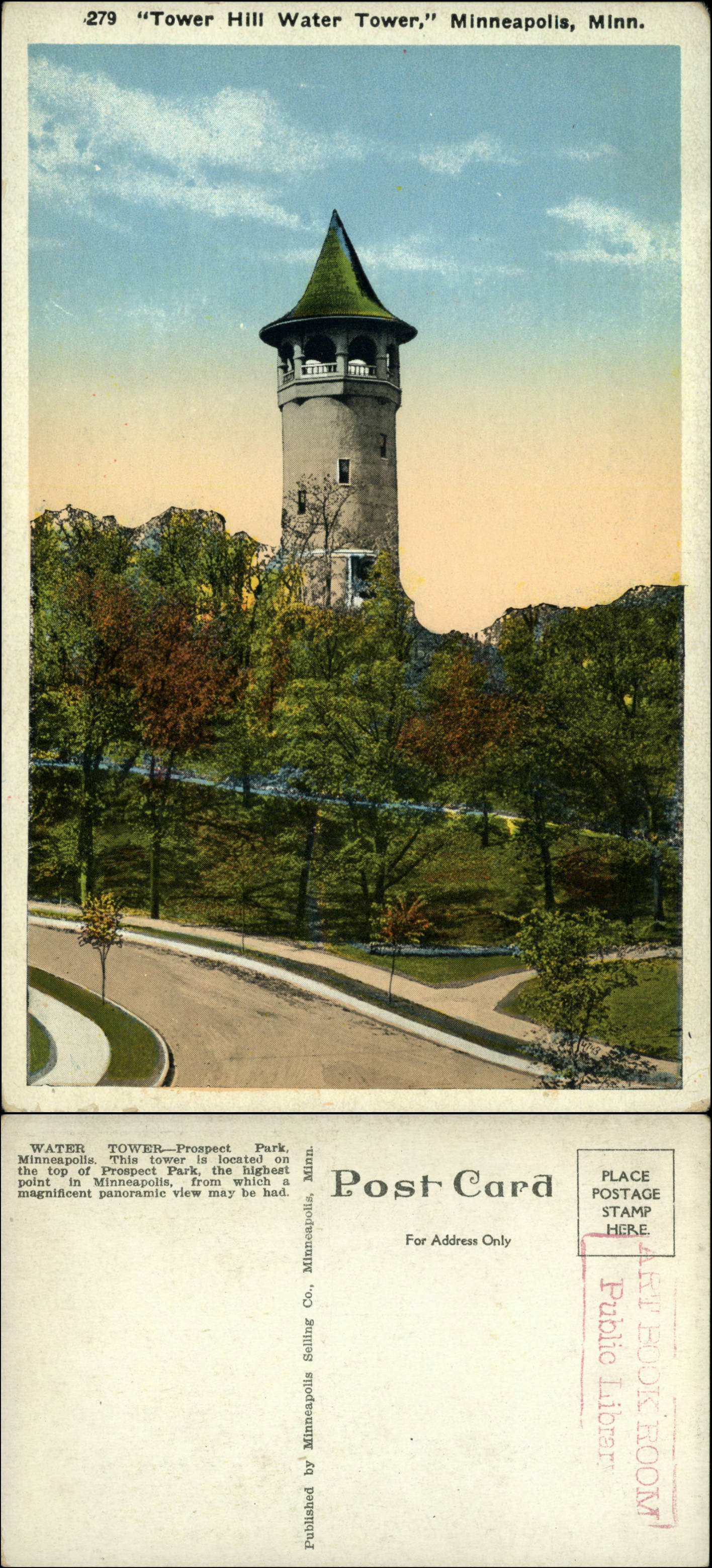
"Tower Hill Water Tower," Minneapolis, Minn. - DPLA - e6d7d9bd5236fd63217fe035b744b48a

== See also ==
- National Register of Historic Places listings in Hennepin County, Minnesota
