= Frederick William Cappelen =

Norwegian civil engineer from Minneapolis (1857–1921)

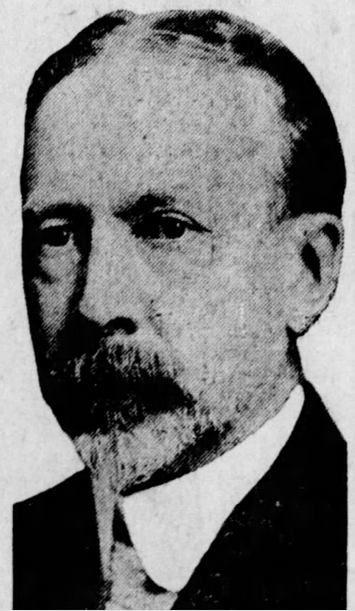
- Born: October 21, 1857; Drammen, Norway
- Died: October 16, 1921 (aged 63); Minneapolis, Minnesota, U.S.
- Resting place: Lakewood Cemetery
- Education: Royal Saxon Polytechnicum
- Occupation: Engineer
- Employer: City of Minneapolis
- Organization: American Society of Civil Engineers
- Notable work: Cappelen Memorial Bridge; Kenwood Park Water Tower; Prospect Park Water Tower

Frederick William Cappelen (October 21, 1857 – October 16, 1921) was a Norwegian-born architect and civil engineer who held the office of Minneapolis City Engineer.

Frederick William Cappelen was born in Drammen, Norway. He attended school in Fredrikstad in Østfold county, Norway. He was educated at the Technical School in Örebro, Sweden and then at the Royal Saxon Polytechnicum (now Dresden University of Technology) in Dresden, Germany before emigrating to the United States in 1880.

Cappelen was initially employed by the Northern Pacific Railroad and in 1886 became a City of Minneapolis bridge engineer. He was elected City Engineer in 1893 and re-elected in 1913. He held membership in the American Society of Municipal Improvements and the Minneapolis Society of Engineers. He was elected a member of the American Society of Civil Engineers on April 3, 1895.

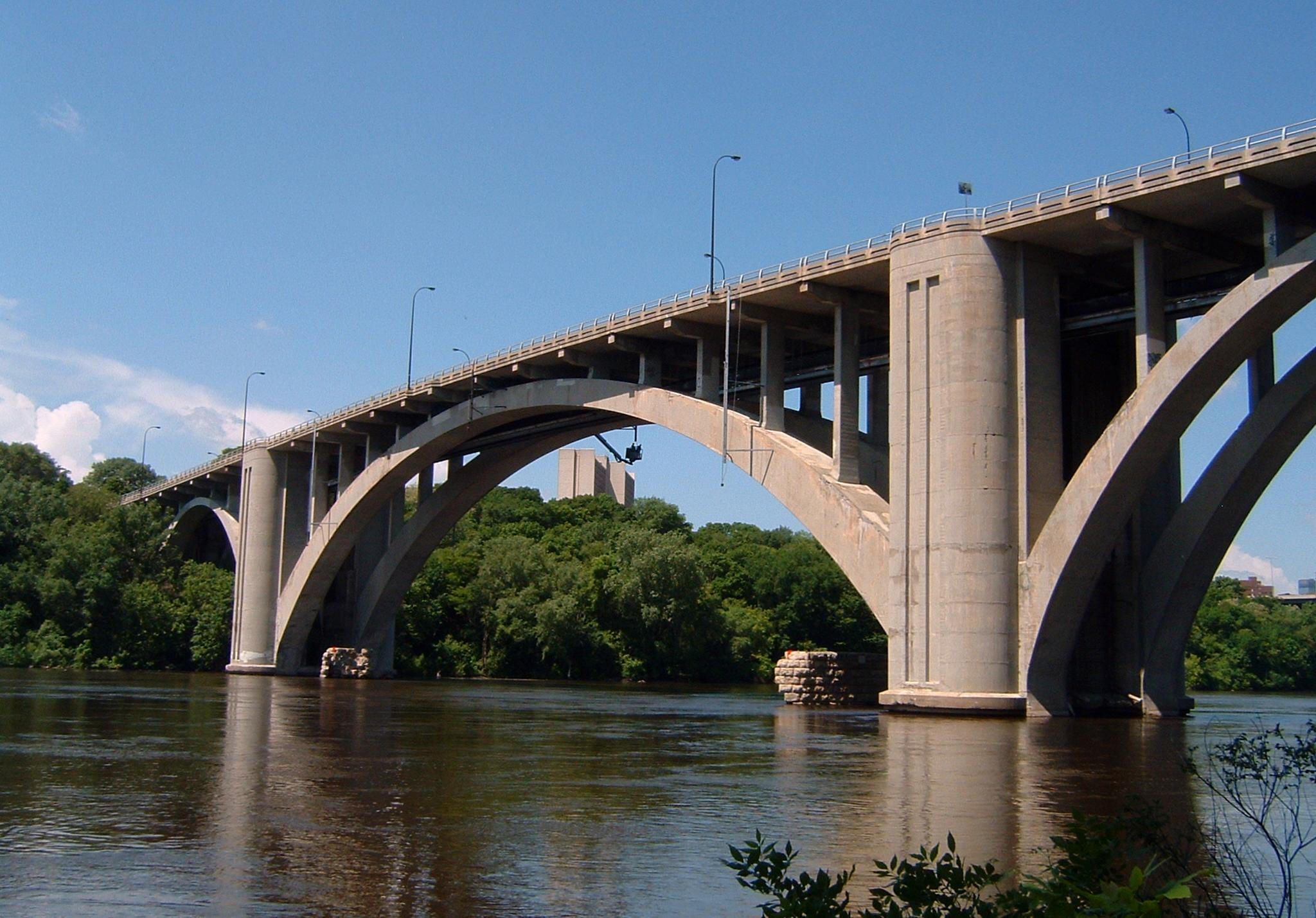
The F.W. Cappelen Memorial Bridge (Franklin Avenue Bridge), Minneapolis

Cappelen was responsible for the design of many public works buildings in Minneapolis, for example the Prospect Park Water Tower, the Kenwood Park Water Tower, and the Cappelen Memorial Bridge, which is named in honor of him.

Cappelen died during the construction of the bridge on February 16, 1921 following an operation for appendicitis. He was buried in Lakewood Cemetery. As a memorial to his life and career, the city council decided immediately after Cappelen's death to name the bridge in his honor. The bridge still bears his name.
