= Reinforced-Concrete Highway Bridges in Minnesota MPS =

Reinforced-Concrete Highway Bridges in Minnesota MPS is a Multiple Property Submission of bridges listed on the National Register of Historic Places in Minnesota. The submission includes 20 individual bridges. It also includes the Chicago, Milwaukee and St. Paul Railroad Grade Separation, which comprises 30 bridges built over the Milwaukee Road tracks one block north of Lake Street in Minneapolis. The submission traces the historical context of reinforced concrete bridge building in Minnesota and cites examples of early and historic bridges.

The submission establishes criteria for bridges to be listed on the National Register. The National Register contains four primary criteria:

- A. Properties significant to the broad patterns of American history. This Multiple Property Submission selects bridges that are significantly relevant to a region's development and its transportation system. The bridges in the Chicago, Milwaukee and St. Paul Railroad Grade Separation are listed in this category because while its bridges are not significant engineering achievements, they provided relief to citizens in south Minneapolis who had to deal with train traffic.
- B. Properties associated with a significant person in America's past. However, bridges significant in conjunction with their architect are to be listed under criterion C. It is possible, although unlikely, that a particular bridge may be associated with a significant person other than its designer, such as a politician or city official who advocated for its construction.
- C. Properties significant for their design and construction methods. The Minnesota Historical Society, in preparing this MPS, decided to select bridges with important qualities. For example, a bridge that is the oldest of its type, the last surviving member of its type, having the longest span of its type, or associated with a prominent major architect, will be selected as part of this MPS.
- D. Properties with information potential likely to yield information pertinent to history or prehistory. This is not applicable to reinforced-concrete bridges in Minnesota.

The MPS also documents several eras that were important in reinforced-concrete bridge construction:

- Early experimental designs from the 1890s through 1911
- Early standardized designs promoted by the Minnesota Highway Commission from 1912 through 1921
- A period of Minnesota Highway Department, trunk highway, and major urban bridge building from 1921 through 1945

The Franklin Avenue Bridge and the Mendota Bridge are listed in the MPS as examples of monumental concrete arch bridge construction, but these bridges were listed on the National Register before the MPS was submitted.

	Landmark name	Image	Date listed	Location	City or Town	Summary
1	Bridge No. 3355-Kathio Township		June 29, 1998	US-169 over Whitefish Cr. 46°12′56″N 93°47′33″W	Kathio Township	
2	Bridge No. 3589-Silver Creek Township		June 29, 1998	US-61 over Stewart R. 47°2′59″N 91°37′50″W	Silver Creek Township	
3	Bridge No. 5083-Marshall		June 29, 1998	MN 19 over Redwood R. 44°26′58″N 95°47′6″W	Marshall	
4	Bridge No. 5151-Marshall		June 29, 1998	MN 19 over Redwood R. 44°26′35″N 95°47′58″W	Marshall	
5	Bridge No. 8096		June 26, 1998	MN 19 over Spring Cr. 44°27′51″N 93°9′13″W	Northfield	
6	Bridge No. L-2162		November 6, 1989	Co. Rd. 51 over Split Rock Creek; 43°46′46″N 96°25′54″W	Jasper	
7	Bridge No. L-2315		November 6, 1989	Twp. Rd. 89 over Rock River; 43°33′21″N 96°9′9″W	Luverne	
8	Bridge No. L-2316		November 6, 1989	Twp. Rd. 89 over Rock River; 43°33′31″N 96°9′9″W	Luverne	
9	Bridge No. L-4646		November 6, 1989	Sixth St. over Spring Brook; 43°36′55″N 96°21′34″W	Beaver Creek	
10	Bridges No. L-5853 and 92247		November 6, 1989	Lexington Ave. in Como Park; 44°58′42″N 93°8′47″W	St. Paul	Early reinforced-concrete bridges built using the Melan system for reinforcement
11	Broadway Bridge		August 5, 1999	MN 99 over Minnesota River, Oshawa Twp. 44°19′29″N 93°57′10″W	Saint Peter	
12	Cedar Avenue Bridge		November 6, 1989	Tenth Ave. over Mississippi River; 44°58′31″N 93°14′45″W	Minneapolis	
13	Chicago, Milwaukee and St. Paul Railroad Grade Separation		June 1, 2005	Parallel to 29th St. between Humboldt & 20th Aves. S. 44°57′3″N 93°16′18″W	Minneapolis	
14	Faribault Viaduct		November 6, 1989	Division St. over Straight River; 44°17′27″N 93°16′0″W	Faribault	
15	Intercity Bridge		November 6, 1989	Ford Pkwy. over Mississippi River; 44°55′4″N 93°12′14″W	St. Paul	
16	Interlachen Bridge		November 6, 1989	William Berry Dr. over Minnesota Transportation Museum street railway track in William Berry Park; 44°55′53″N 93°18′31″W	Minneapolis	
17	Lester River Bridge-Bridge No. 5772		September 6, 2002	London Rd. over the Lester R. 46°50′12″N 92°0′22″W	Duluth	
18	Nymore Bridge		November 6, 1989	First St. over Mississippi River; 47°28′1″N 94°52′42″W	Bemidji	
19	Queen Avenue Bridge		November 6, 1989	W. Lake Harriet Blvd. over Minnesota Transportation Museum street railway track 44°55′28″N 93°18′40″W	Minneapolis	
20	Robert Street Bridge		November 6, 1989	Robert St. over Mississippi River; 44°56′41″N 93°5′17″W	St. Paul	
