= Bridges No. L-5853 and 92247 =

- U.S. National Register of Historic Places
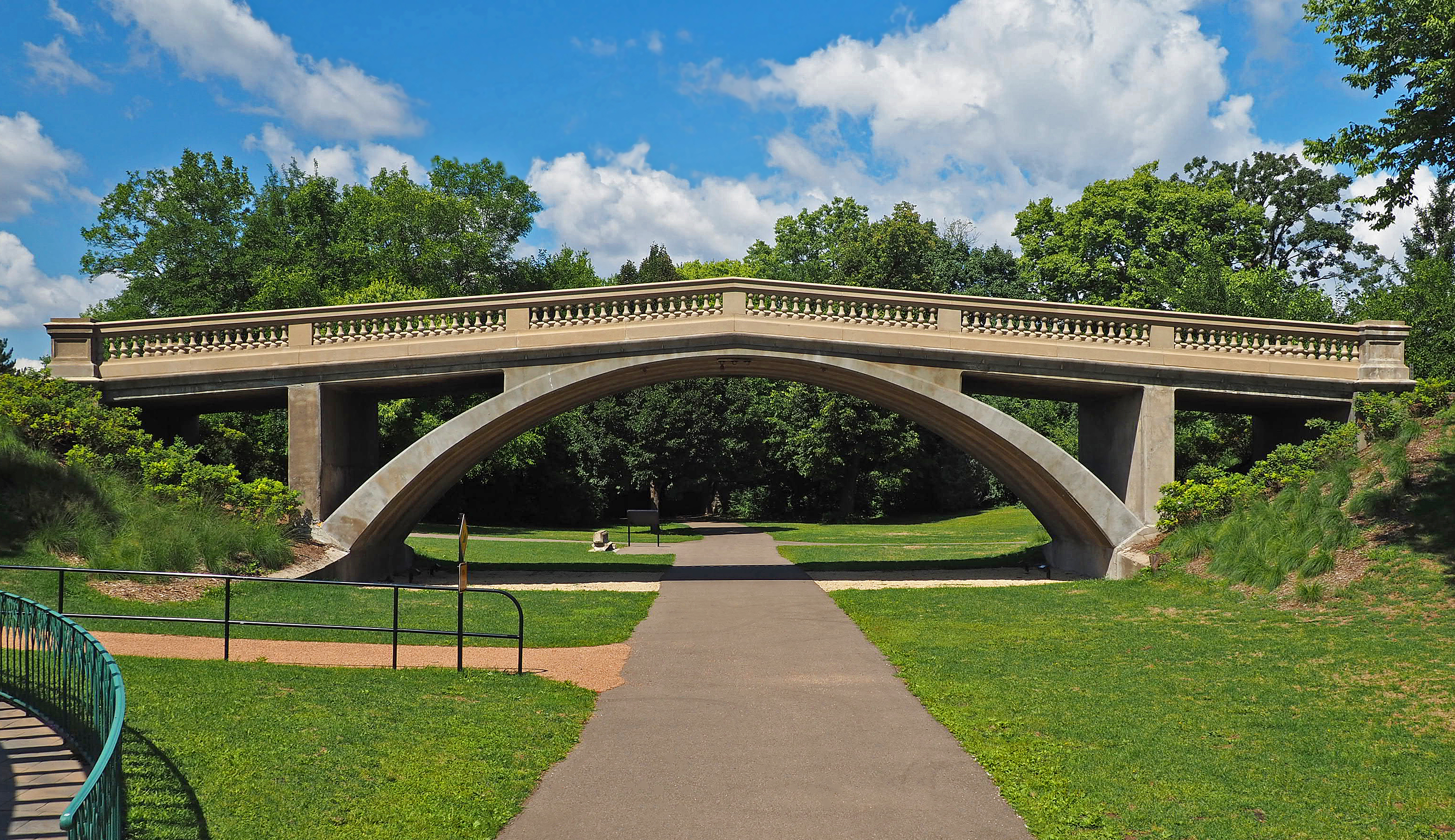
- Bridge L-5853, a pedestrian bridge

- Location within Minnesota Location within the United States
- Location: Lexington Avenue in Como Park; Saint Paul, Minnesota
- Coordinates: 44°58′42″N 93°8′47″W
- Built: 1904
- Architect: William S. Hewett & Co., Josef Melan
- MPS: Reinforced-Concrete Highway Bridges in Minnesota MPS
- NRHP reference No.: 89001842
- Added to NRHP: November 6, 1989

Bridges No. L-5853 and 92247 are two side-by-side bridges in Saint Paul, Minnesota, United States. They were built in 1904 over the Como-Harriet streetcar line, connecting the nearby Twin City Rapid Transit Company station to the line running west to Minneapolis; Bridge No. 92247 carries traffic on Lexington Avenue over the tracks and Bridge No. L-5853 carried pedestrians; the latter is an example of an early reinforced concrete arch bridge, using the Melan reinforcing system by the William S. Hewett & Company of Minneapolis.

The bridges were evaluated as part of the Reinforced-Concrete Highway Bridges in Minnesota MPS, and were listed on the National Register of Historic Places in 1989.

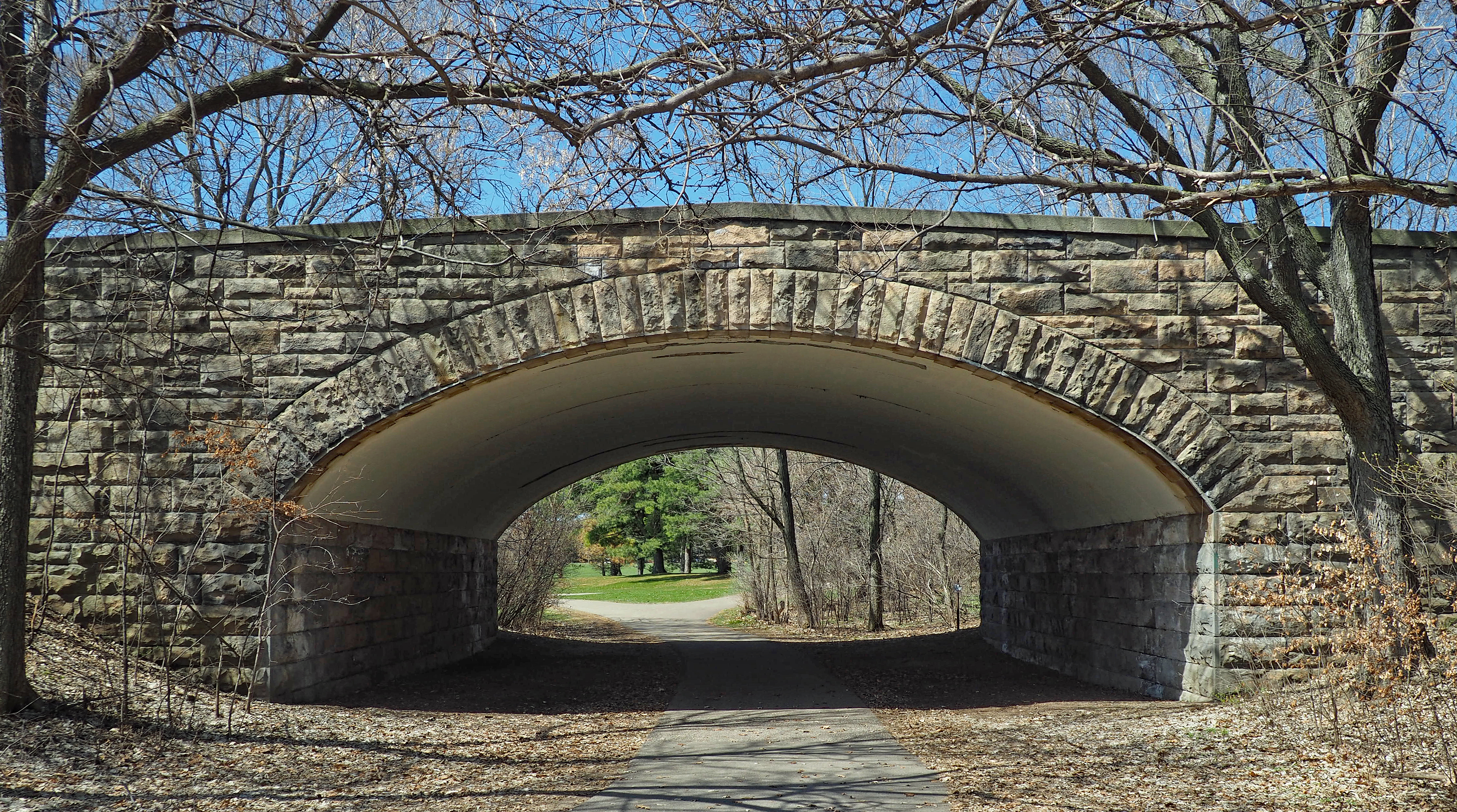
Bridge 92247, which carries traffic on Lexington Avenue

== See also ==
- Interlachen Bridge in Minneapolis, Minnesota, built by the same engineer and also using the Melan reinforcing system
