= Interlachen Bridge =

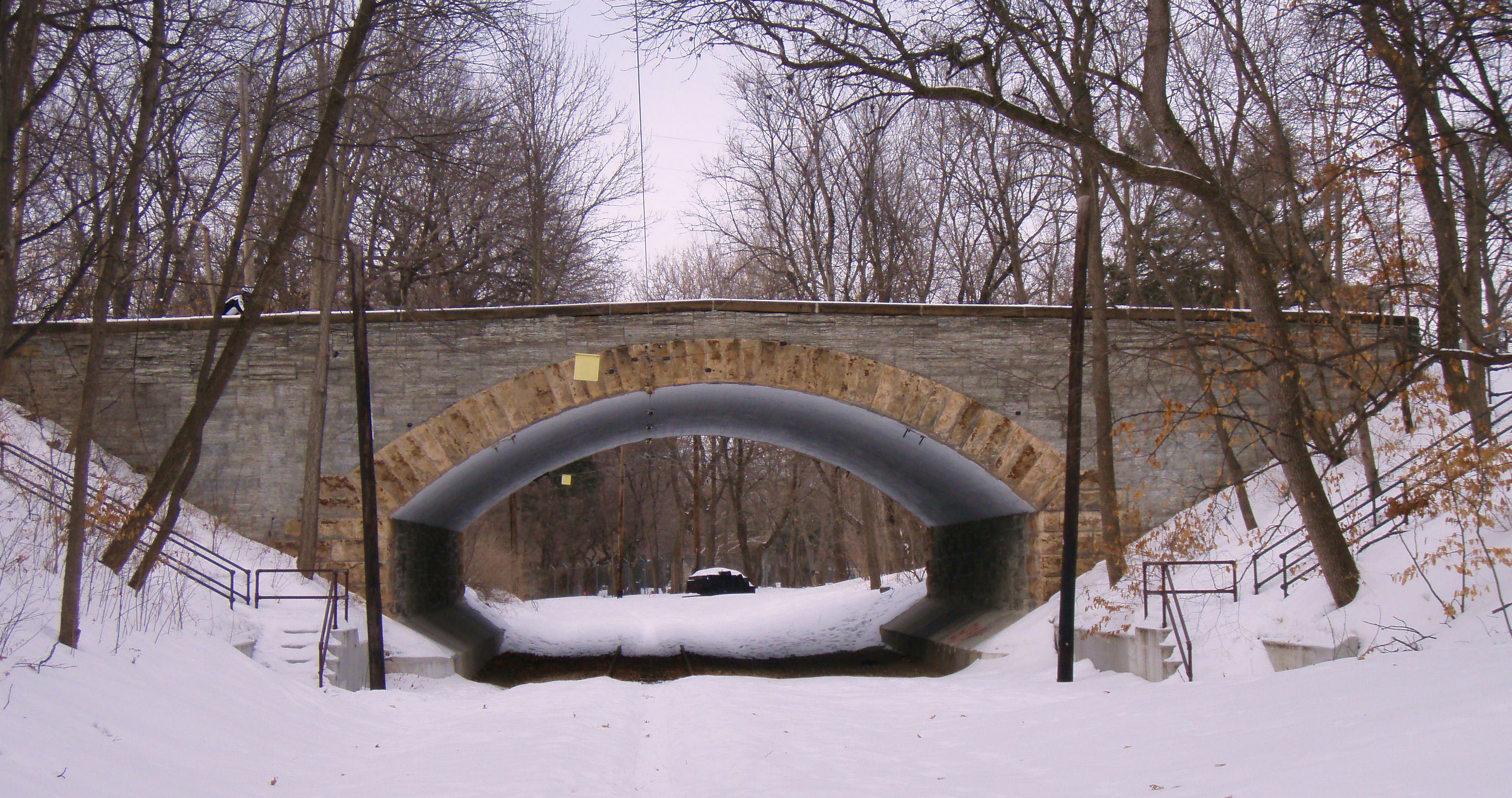
- Coordinates: 44°55′53″N 93°18′31″W
- Carries: Two lanes of William Berry Parkway
- Crosses: The Como-Harriet Streetcar Line a former Twin City Rapid Transit streetcar line now operated by the Minnesota Streetcar Museum
- Locale: Minneapolis, Minnesota
- Maintained by: Minneapolis Park Board
- ID number: L9328

Characteristics
- Design: Concrete arch using the Melan reinforcement system
- Total length: 40 ft (12 m)
- Width: 63 ft (19 m)
- Longest span: 38.6 feet
- Clearance below: 16 feet

History
- Opened: 1900
- Interlachen Bridge
- U.S. National Register of Historic Places
- Location within Minnesota
- Location: William Berry Dr. over Minnesota Transportation Museum street railway track in William Berry Park, Minneapolis, Minnesota
- Area: less than one acre
- Built: 1900
- Architect: Josef Melan; William S. Hewett & Co.
- Architectural style: Reinforced-concrete bridge
- MPS: Reinforced-Concrete Highway Bridges in Minnesota MPS
- NRHP reference No.: 89001840
- Added to NRHP: November 6, 1989

Location
- Interactive map of Interlachen Bridge

The Interlachen Bridge is a reinforced concrete arch bridge on William Berry Parkway between Bde Maka Ska and Lake Harriet in Minneapolis, Minnesota. The bridge crosses the Como-Harriet Streetcar Line, a heritage streetcar line operated by the Minnesota Streetcar Museum which follows the same right-of-way as the original Twin Cities Rapid Transit line of the same name. The bridge was designed by local builder William S. Hewett. The bridge is one of the most significant bridges in Minnesota because it is the earliest known extant concrete bridge with a documented construction date. The bridge was listed on the National Register of Historic Places on November 6, 1989, as part of the Reinforced-Concrete Highway Bridges in Minnesota MPS.

The Interlachen Bridge was based on the Melan reinforcing system, invented by Viennese engineer Josef Melan and patented in the United States in 1894.

In order to appeal to development in the area, the bridge was constructed with access to the streetcar line. Stairs at either end of the bridge on the south side lead down to the Cottage City stop, named after the neighborhood it served. After streetcar service ceased in 1954, the neighborhood's identity shifted and became part of Linden Hills. The station remains largely intact today.

== See also ==
- Queen Avenue Bridge – similar nearby bridge over TCRT right-of-way
