= Queen Avenue Bridge =

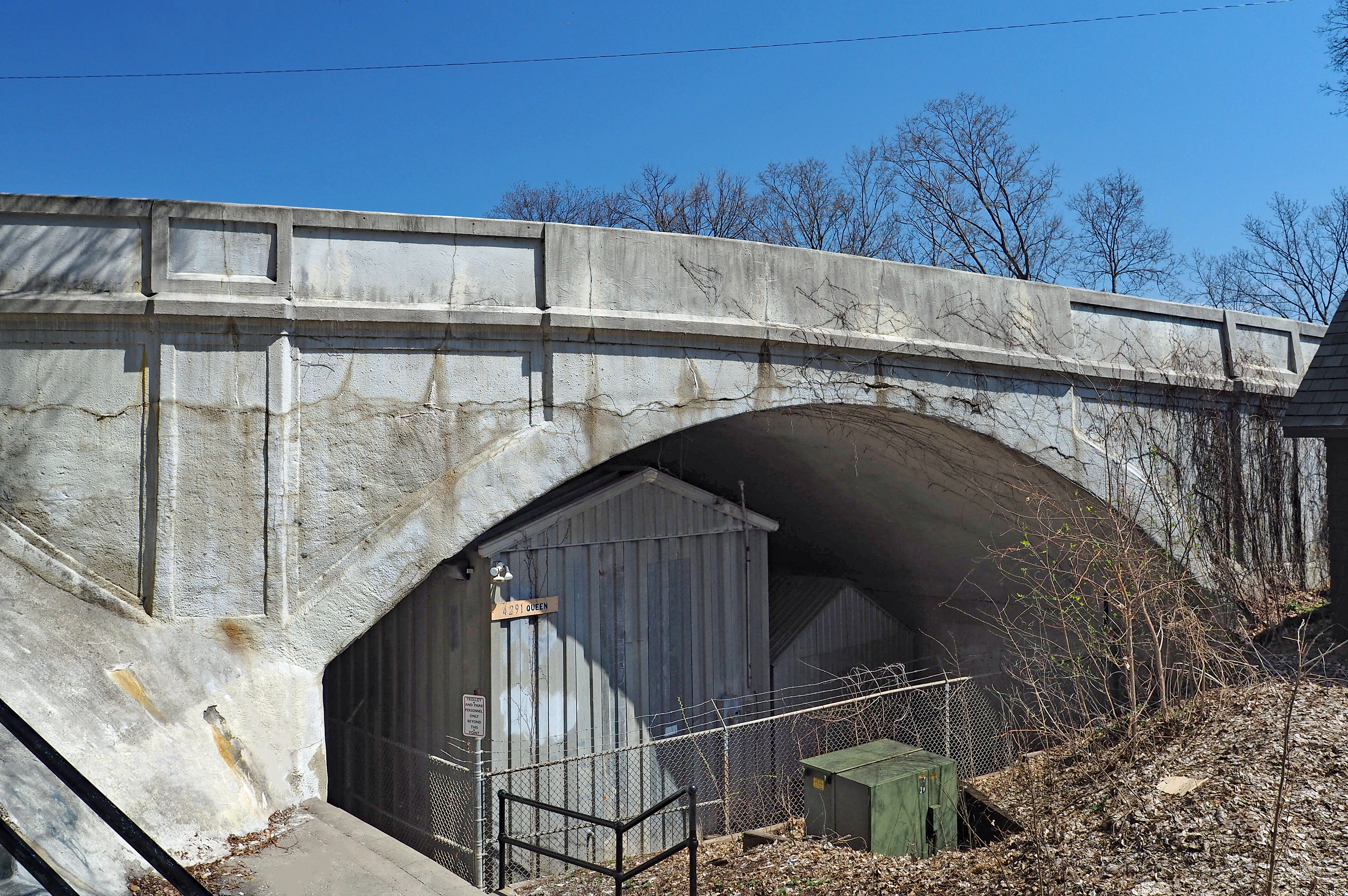
- Queen Avenue Bridge from the southwest, with the sheds underneath used by the Minnesota Streetcar Museum
- Coordinates: 44°55′28.32″N 93°18′40.63″W
- Carries: Queen Avenue S.
- Crosses: Como-Harriet Streetcar Line
- Locale: Minneapolis, Minnesota
- Owner: City of Minneapolis
- Maintained by: City of Minneapolis
- ID number: L9329

Characteristics
- Design: Concrete Culvert (includes frame culverts)
- Total length: 12.8 metres (42 ft)
- Longest span: 11 metres (36 ft)
- Clearance below: 5.76 metres (18.9 ft)

History
- Opened: 1905

Statistics
- Daily traffic: 774
- Queen Avenue Bridge
- U.S. National Register of Historic Places
- Location within Minnesota Location within the United States
- Location: Linden Hills Boulevard over the Como-Harriet Streetcar Line, Minneapolis, Minnesota
- Built: 1905
- Architect: Charles R. Shepley, Minneapolis Street Railway Co.
- MPS: Reinforced-Concrete Highway Bridges in Minnesota MPS
- NRHP reference No.: 89001847
- Added to NRHP: November 6, 1989

Location
- Interactive map of Queen Avenue Bridge

The Queen Avenue Bridge is a reinforced concrete single-span barrel arch bridge in Minneapolis that spans the tracks used by the Minnesota Streetcar Museum. The bridge was built in 1905 and is listed on the National Register of Historic Places.

Much of the significance of the bridge is due to it being the third-oldest reinforced concrete arch bridge in Minnesota. It also retains most of the integrity of the design from its original plans. It was evaluated in 1989 as part of the Reinforced-Concrete Highway Bridges in Minnesota MPS, and then listed on the National Register that year.

The bridge was constructed by the Twin City Rapid Transit Company to replace a wooden bridge spanning the company's private streetcar right-of-way. Stairs at either end of the bridge on the south side provided access to a streetcar stop. The line was abandoned in 1954. In 1971 the Minnesota Streetcar Museum opened the Como-Harriet Streetcar Line along the original right-of-way. The southern end of the line is at the car barn is located under the bridge, accessible from the original west stair.

== See also ==
- Interlachen Bridge – similar nearby bridge over TCRT right-of-way
