= Bridge No. 1482 =

Historic bridge near Luverne, Minnesota

- U.S. National Register of Historic Places
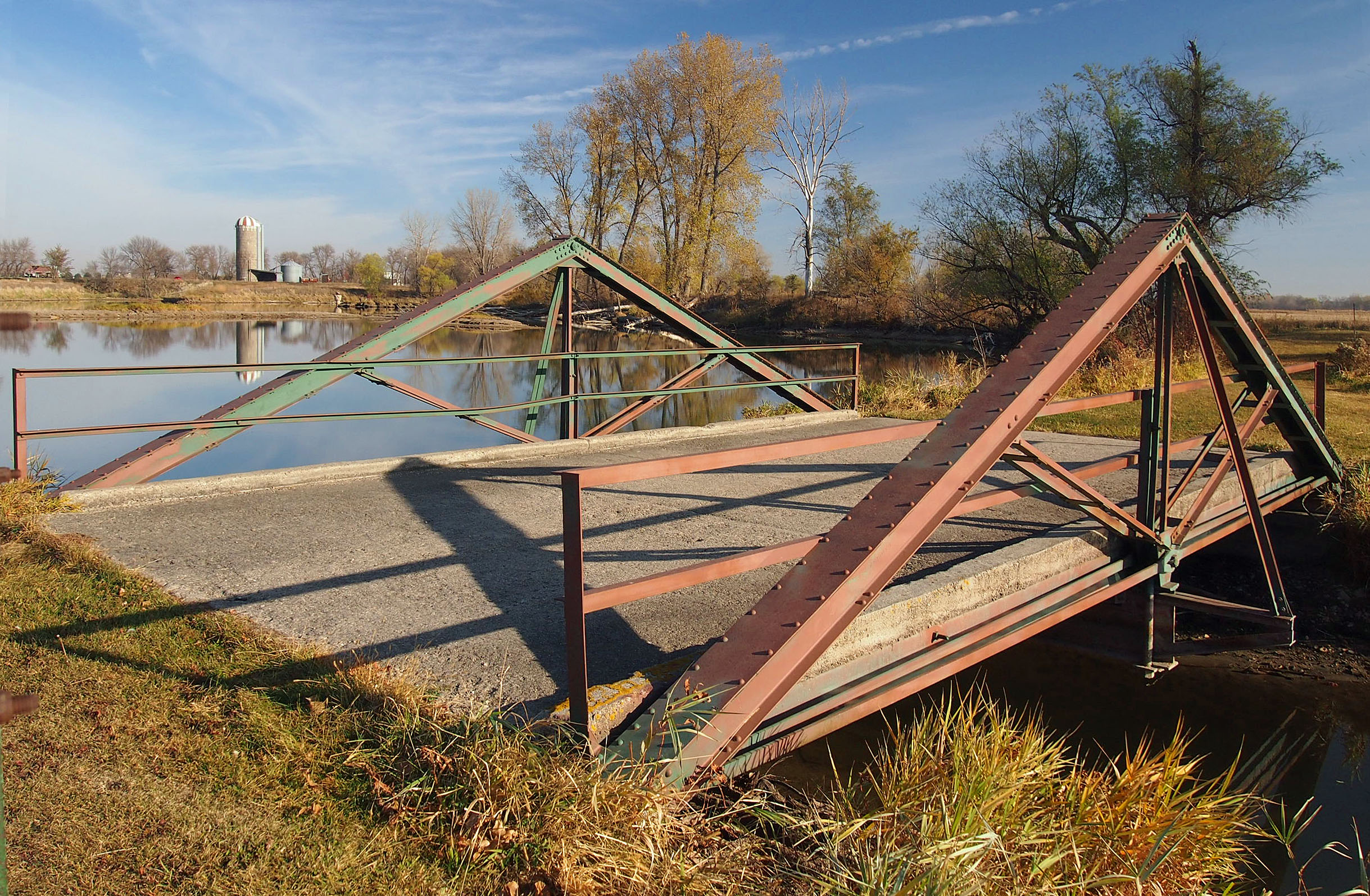
- Bridge No. 1482 in Schoneman County Park.

- Location within Minnesota
- Nearest city: Luverne, Minnesota
- Coordinates: 43°37′45″N 96°12′36″W
- Area: less than one acre
- Built: 1908
- Built by: Hewett Bridge Co.
- Architectural style: Single-span pony truss
- MPS: Iron and Steel Bridges in Minnesota MPS
- NRHP reference No.: 92000775
- Added to NRHP: June 25, 1992

Bridge No. 1482 is a king post pony truss bridge in Luverne Township, Minnesota, immediately south of the city of Luverne. The bridge, built in 1908, originally crossed the Rock River on a rural roadway on the boundary between Luverne and Clinton Township. In 1990, the Rock River bridge was replaced by a stronger bridge, and Bridge No. 1482 was moved to Schoneman County Park.

A 1907 Minnesota law required counties to pay half the cost of any bridge built within their borders. On July 13, 1908, the supervisor of Luverne Township petitioned the Rock County board for the construction of a bridge over the Rock River. The county board awarded the contract to the Hewett Bridge Company of Minneapolis the next week. It ended up being one of twenty bridges built in Rock County in 1908.

The bridge was listed on the National Register of Historic Places in 1992. It is the only known steel, pin-connected, king-post pony truss bridge left in Minnesota.
