= Joliet Bridge =

- U.S. National Register of Historic Places
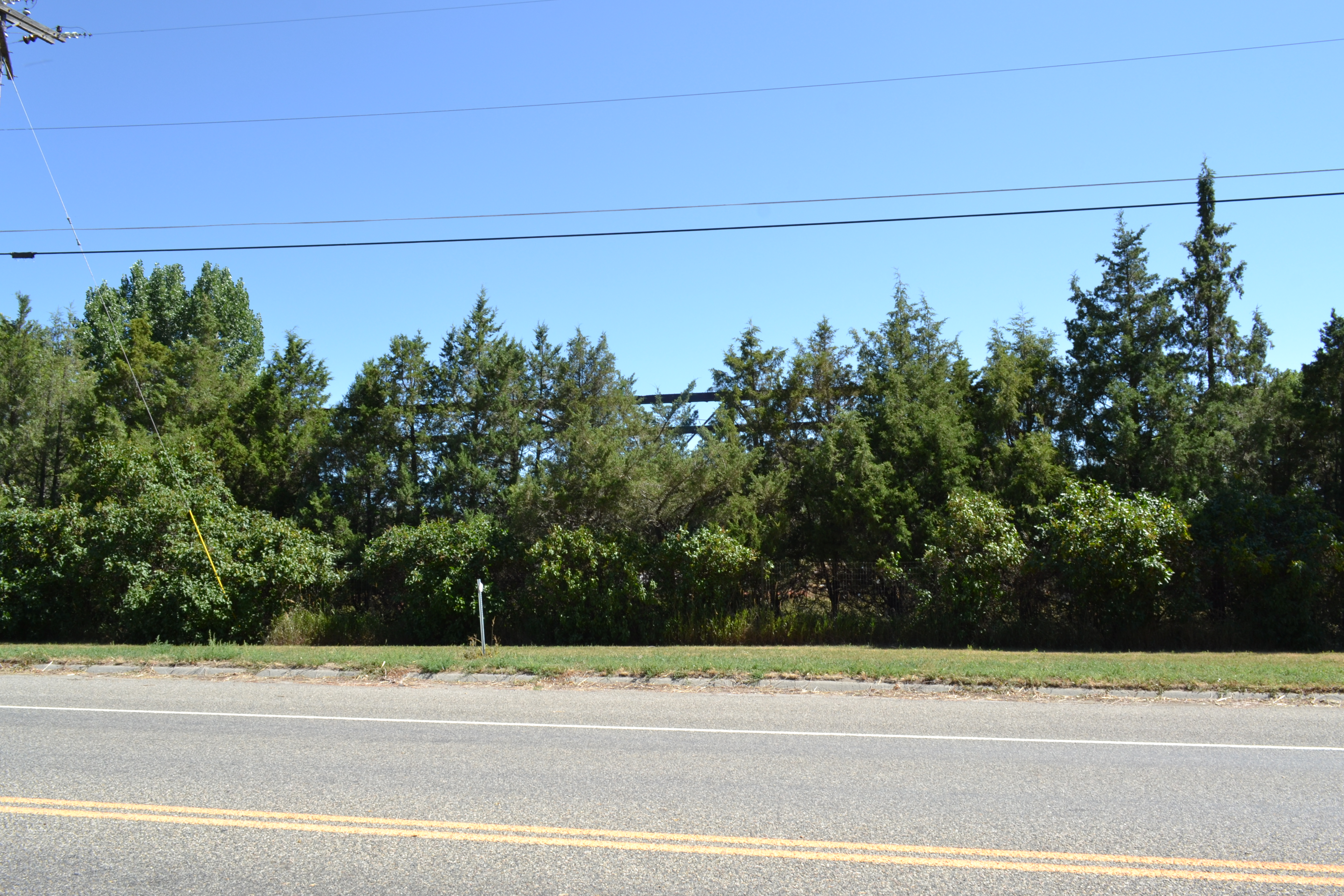

- Location within Montana Location within the United States
- Nearest city: Joliet, Montana
- Coordinates: 45°28′52″N 108°58′04″W
- Area: less than one acre
- Built: 1901
- Built by: William S. Hewett
- Architectural style: Pratt through truss
- MPS: Joliet Montana MRA
- NRHP reference No.: 86000888
- Added to NRHP: May 2, 1986

The Joliet Bridge, in Carbon County, Montana, near Joliet, is a Pratt through truss bridge built in 1901. It was listed on the National Register of Historic Places in 1986.

It is a multiple-span road bridge. The main span is a pin-connected steel Pratt truss, about 129 feet (39 m) long, resting on concrete abutments and cylindrical piers. On the south end, there are approach spans made of wood stringers (horizontal timbers) supported by timber pile bents; these replaced an original pony truss approach span. The deck is made of wood bridge planks, covered with asphalt.

It was designed and built by William S. Hewett, a bridge builder based in Minneapolis, who was low bidder on the contract for the main bridge, at $4,500, and also for an approach span, at $750, which had to be added, perhaps because the original measurements or specifications were not adequate.

The bridge carries Main Street road over Rock Creek, south of the town.

== See also ==
- List of bridges documented by the Historic American Engineering Record in Montana
- List of bridges on the National Register of Historic Places in Montana
