= Broadway Bridge (St. Peter, Minnesota) =

- U.S. National Register of Historic Places
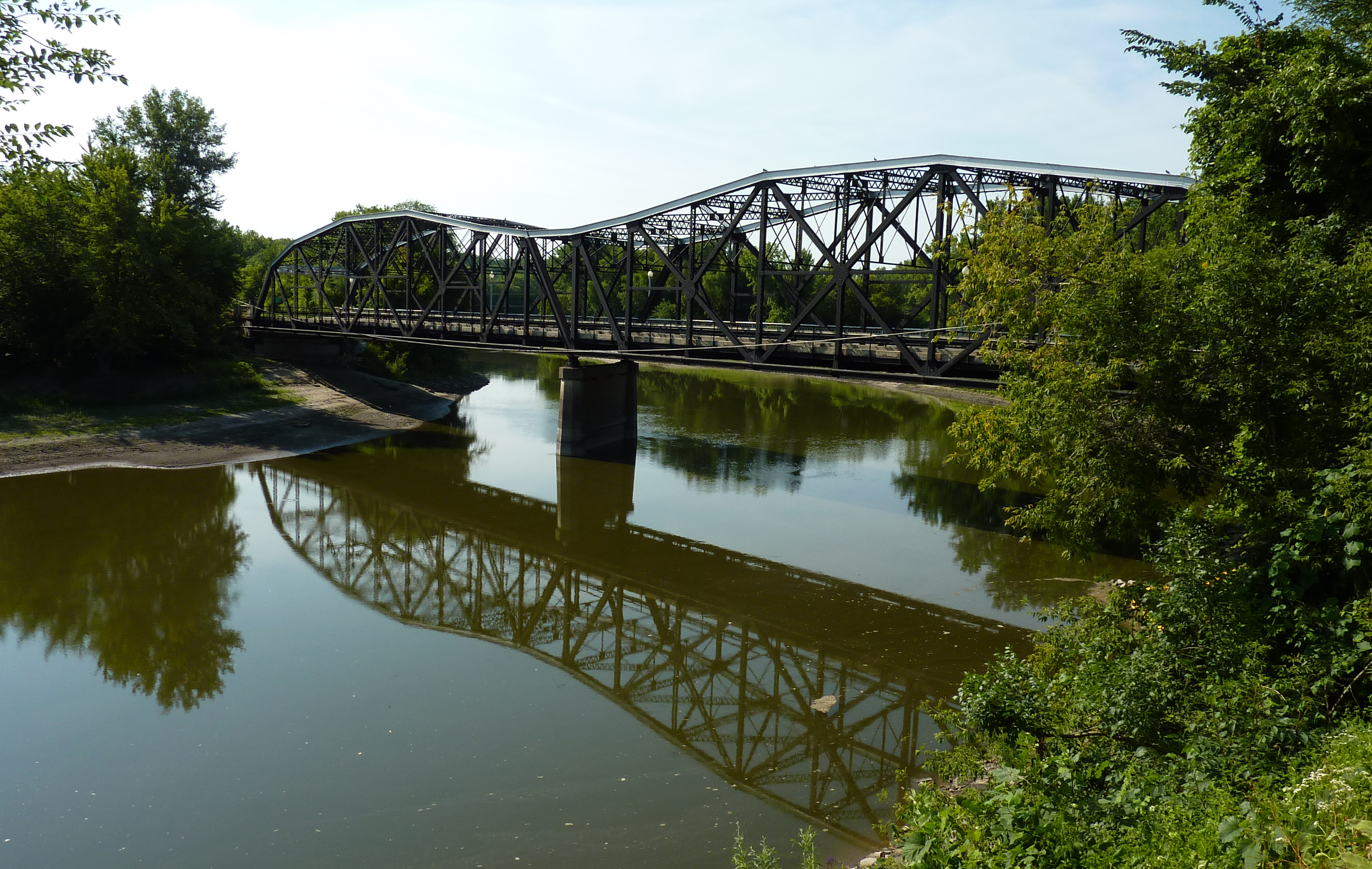
- The bridge reflected in the Minnesota River

- Location within Minnesota Location within the United States
- Nearest city: St. Peter, Minnesota
- Coordinates: 44°19′29″N 93°57′11″W
- Built: 1931
- NRHP reference No.: 99000934
- Designated: August 5, 1999

Broadway Bridge is a Pennsylvania through truss reinforced-concrete highway bridge which carries Minnesota 99 over the Minnesota River in St. Peter, Minnesota, United States. It was built in 1931 by the Minneapolis Bridge Company following a skewed steel design by the Minnesota Highway Department.

For much of 2017, the Minnesota Department of Transportation closed the bridge for a major rehabilitation which included enclosing it in plastic for the removal of lead paint. The project, which cost about $4.4 million, preserved the bridge, which had been in poor condition, and restored its original dark green color.

== See also ==
- List of bridges on the National Register of Historic Places in Minnesota
- Reinforced-Concrete Highway Bridges in Minnesota MPS
