= Dragon Bridge (Ljubljana) =

Bridge in Slovenia

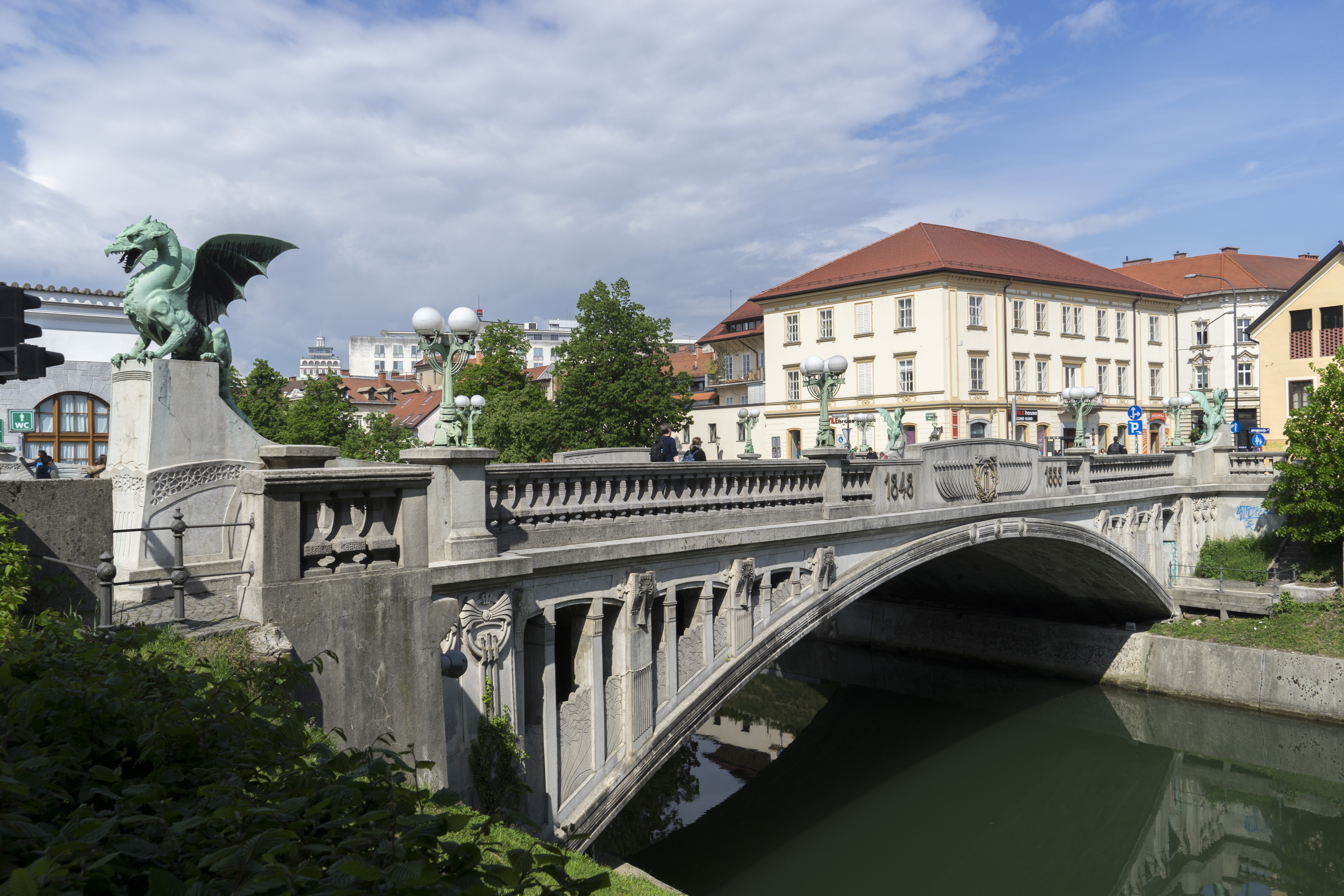
- Coordinates: 46°03′07″N 14°30′36″E
- Crosses: Ljubljanica River
- Locale: Ljubljana, Slovenia

Characteristics
- Design: Arch bridge
- Longest span: 33.34 metres (109.4 ft)

History
- Opened: 1901

The Dragon Bridge (Slovene: Zmajski most, historically also Zmajev most) is a road bridge located in Ljubljana, the capital of Slovenia. It crosses the Ljubljanica River. between Kopitar Street (Kopitarjeva ulica) and Ressel Street (Resljeva cesta), to the north of the Ljubljana Central Market at Vodnik Square. It was built in the beginning of the 20th century, when Ljubljana was part of the Austro-Hungarian Empire. As one of the best examples of reinforced concrete bridges and of the Vienna Secession style, the bridge is today protected as a technical monument. It is intended primarily for motorised traffic.

== Name ==
The bridge was originally named The Jubilee Bridge of the Emperor Franz Josef I (German: Franz Josef I. Jubiläumsbrücke, Slovene: Franca Jožefa I. jubilejni most). In July 1919, it was renamed to Dragon Bridge.

== History ==
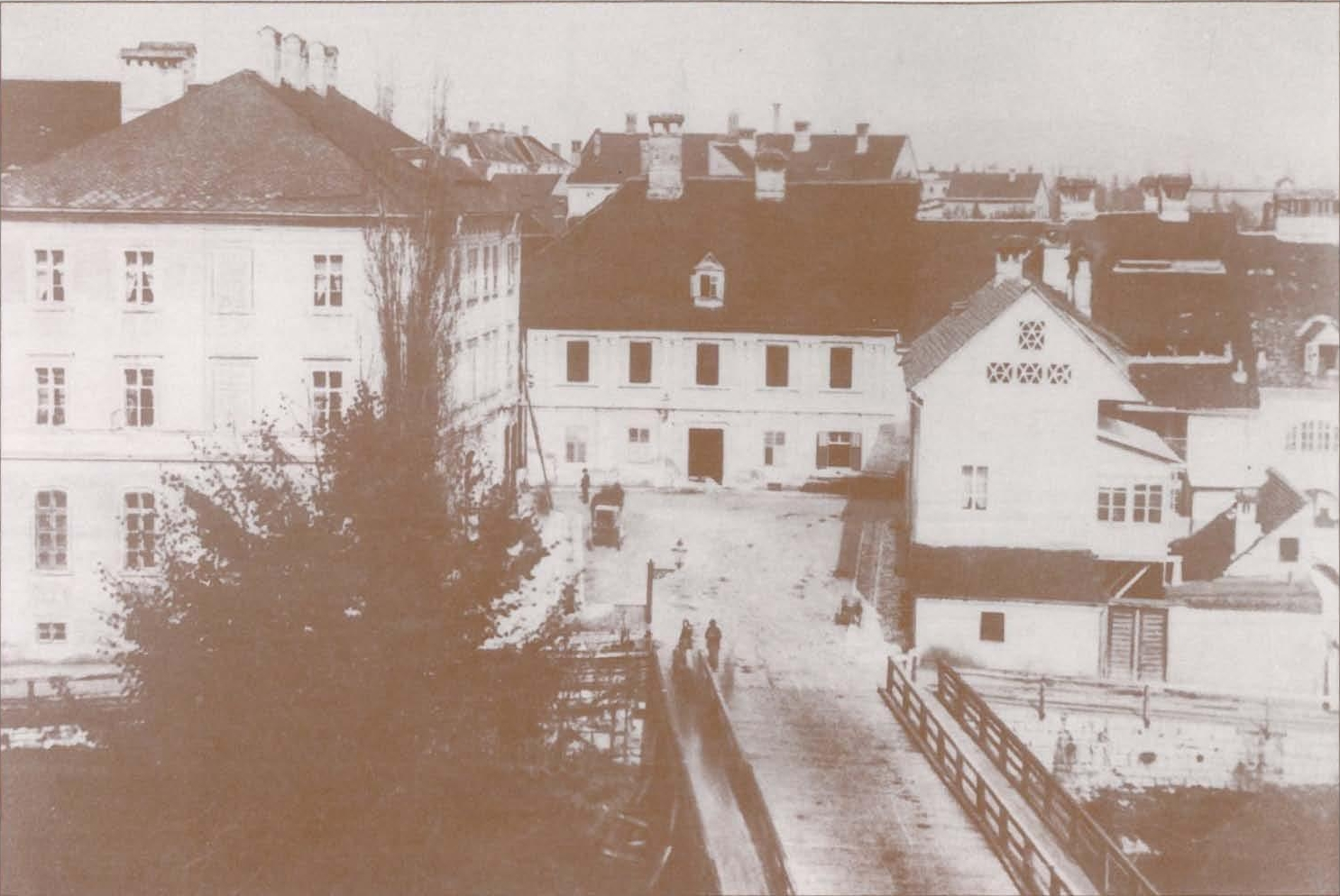
The Butchers' Bridge and Ressel Square before 1882

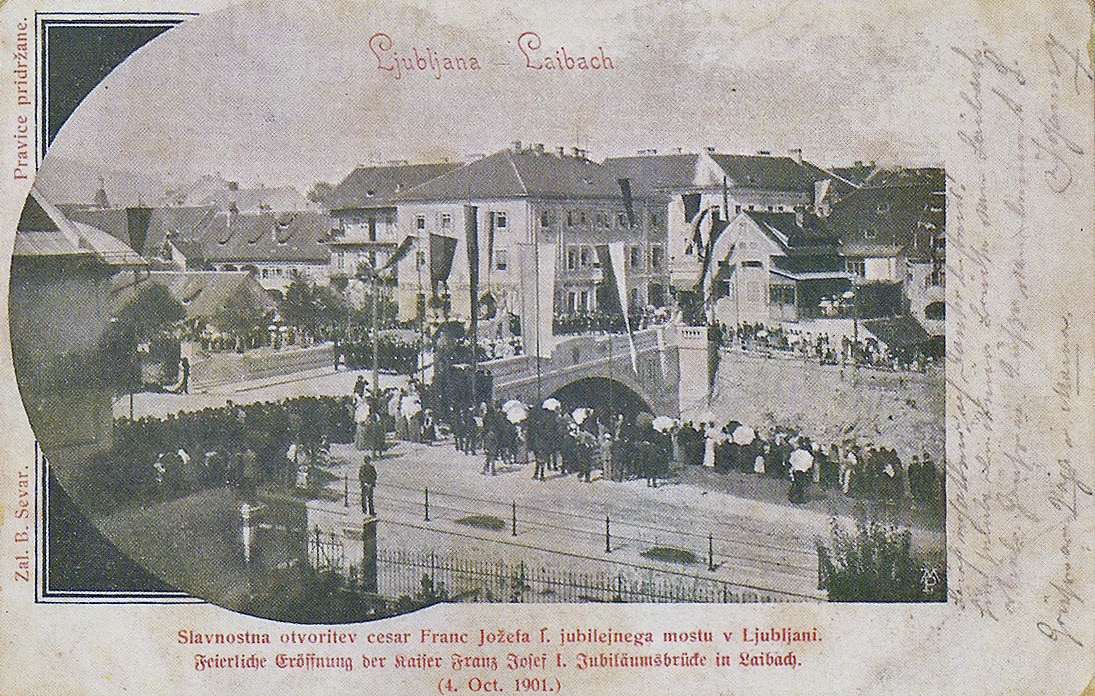
A postcard with a photograph of the unveiling of the Dragon Bridge in October 1901

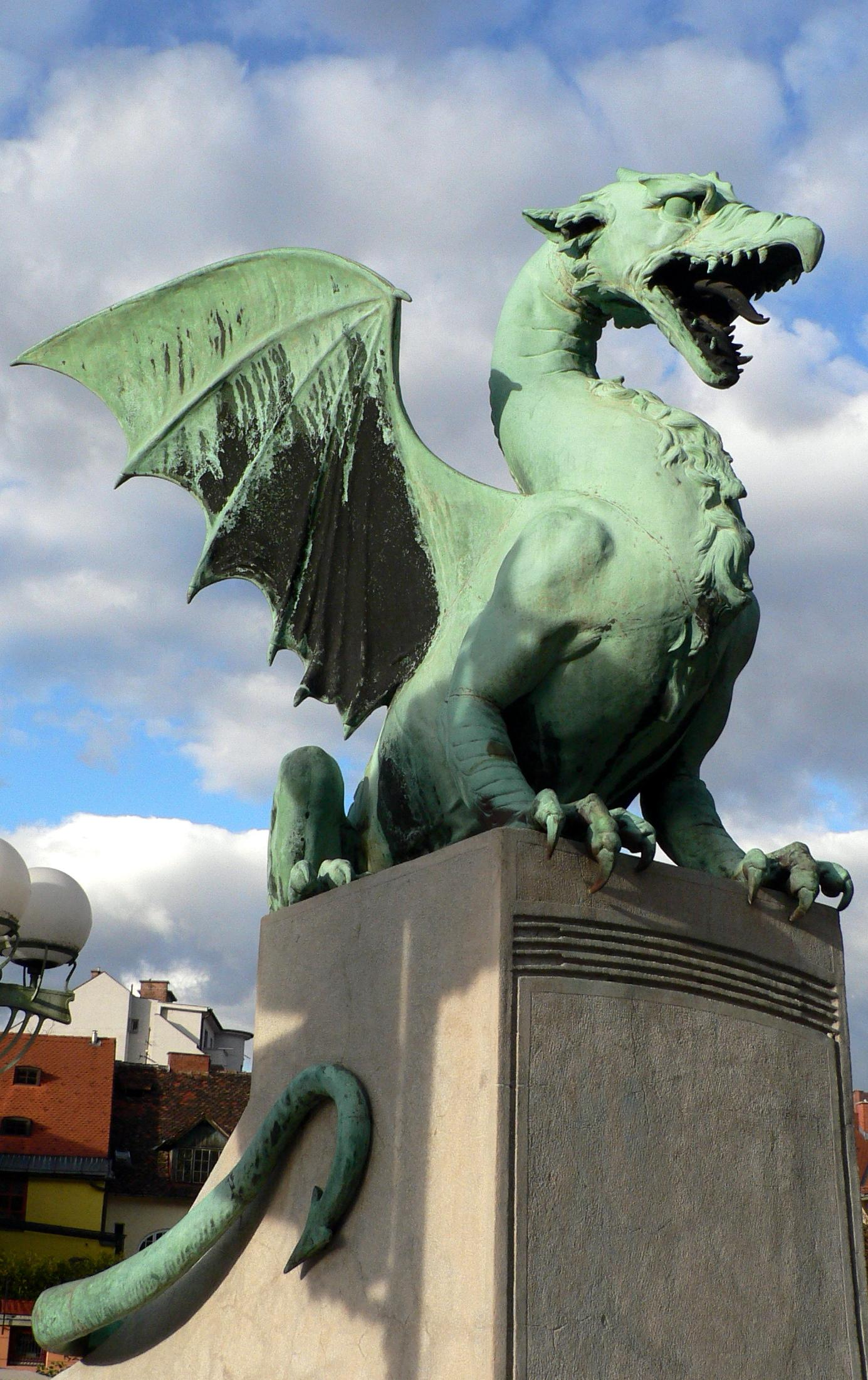
Dragon statue on the bridge

The bridge was built as part of a wider urban renovation of the town during the administration of the mayor Ivan Hribar. It replaced an old oak bridge named the Butchers' Bridge (Mesarski most), which was constructed in 1819 and damaged by a severe earthquake in 1895. The new bridge was constructed of reinforced concrete. Janez Koželj, a professor of urban design, expressed in 2010 his opinion that the new technology of reinforced concrete and new static calculations were used in Ljubljana instead of Vienna, because it meant minor consequences if they had not worked.

The new bridge was constructed upon the plans of Vienna company Pittel+Brausewetter based on a patent by Austrian engineer Josef Melan and the design by the company's architect Giorgio Zaninovich, the graduate of Otto Wagner's school. The works started on 1 July 1900 and were at first led by Austrian engineer Alexander Zabokrzycky, assisted by Filip Supančič from Ljubljana. After a dispute, the works were in April 1901 taken over by the architect Ciril Metod Koch, also from Ljubljana. The bridge was solemnly opened for traffic on 4 October 1901 by Anton Bonaventura Jeglič, the Bishop of Ljubljana, in the presence of many distinguished guests, including Zaninović, Melan and Brausewetter. The final works were completed until 1907. The dragons were designed by Zaninović and produced in A. M. Beschorner’s factory in Vienna. When the bridge was completed, it was dedicated to Franz Joseph I of the Habsburg Dynasty to commemorate forty years of his rule from 1848 to 1888.

In 1983 and 1984, the Dragon Bridge was renovated with lightweight concrete, and its centenary was celebrated in 2001.

== Architecture ==
The Dragon Bridge, although significantly modelled after the Nußdorf weir, is often regarded as the most beautiful bridge produced by the Vienna Secession. It was one of Europe's earliest reinforced concrete bridges and the first such bridge in Ljubljana. It was the first bridge in Slovenia to be paved with asphalt. When opened in 1901, it had the third-largest arch in Europe at that time. The bridge is built to the "Melan System" invented by Josef Melan, which gained popularity particularly in the United States and Germany because the bridges could be built without a supporting stage. Rigid truss arches made of iron are set into the reinforced concrete bridge. The load-bearing core of the bridge was the truss iron framework during construction. After concreting, this became a part of the supporting structure.

Dragon Bridge is a triple-hinged arch bridge and has a span of 33.34 metres (109 ft 5 in). Its style was designed by Jurij Zaninović. He envisaged the concrete covering, the balustrades and the sheet-copper dragon statues of the bridge, which is now a symbol of the city. The chief attraction of the bridge are these four dragon statues standing on pedestals at its four corners. In addition, the bridge is decorated by sixteen smaller dragon statues.

== Legend ==
There is a legend that Jason was the founder of Ljubljana, and he and his Argonauts killed a dragon. This is one of the four dragon statues in the bridge. According to local legends, when a virgin crosses the bridge, the dragons will wag their tails. Some local people have nicknamed this structure "mother-in-law" because of its fiery nature.
