= Minnesota Streetcar Museum =

Transport museum in Minneapolis, U.S.

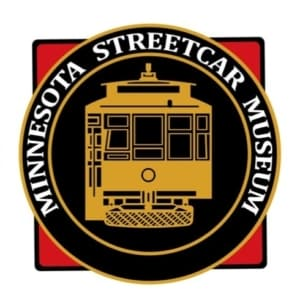

- Established: 2005 (Parent in 1962)
- Location: Twin Cities, Minnesota
- Coordinates: 44°55′29″N 93°18′41″W
- Type: Heritage Streetcar Operator
- Website: www.trolleyride.org

The Minnesota Streetcar Museum (MSM) is a transport museum that operates two heritage streetcar lines in Minneapolis, Minnesota, and the western suburb of Excelsior.

== Museum ==
The museum was created as a result of the restructuring of the Minnesota Transportation Museum (MTM) during the winter of 2004–2005. The MTM was founded in 1962 to restore a streetcar, Twin City Rapid Transit Company No. 1300, that had been operated by the TCRT until the last streetcar lines were abandoned in favor of buses in 1954. Over time, the museum diversified to include diesel and steam-powered trains, buses, steamboats and associated buildings, papers and photographs.

When the MTM was restructured during the winter of 2004 and 2005, the Minnesota Streetcar Museum was created and assumed ownership and operating responsibilities of the two streetcar lines. The Museum of Lake Minnetonka was also created as a result of the split and assumed ownership and operating responsibilities of the restored Steamboat Minnehaha, which was built by TCRT in 1906.

== Como-Harriet Streetcar Line ==
In 1971 the MTM began operations on the Como-Harriet Streetcar Line, a heritage streetcar line in Minneapolis, Minnesota. The mile-plus-long Line runs along the original TCRT streetcar right-of-way between Lake Harriet and Bde Maka Ska and is open to the public. Three restored streetcars formerly used by TCRT are used and the museum has built a replica 1900 station at the intersection of Queen Ave and 42nd Street.

== Excelsior Streetcar Line ==
Excelsior Streetcar Line

Service
- Type: Heritage streetcar

History
- Opened: 1999

Technical
- Track gauge: 4 ft 8 1/2 in (1,435 mm)
- Minimum radius: (?)
- Electrification: (?)

The Excelsior Streetcar Line began operation in 1999 in west-suburban Excelsior near Lake Minnetonka using Duluth Street Railway Company No. 78, transferred from the museum's Como-Harriet Line. TCRT No. 1239 joined No. 78 in 2004. The Line is operated on the former Minneapolis and Saint Louis Railway right-of-way now used by the Hennepin County Regional Railroad Authority as a bicycle trail. All trips feature a tour of the Excelsior Carbarn, where Winona No. 10 is currently being restored and Mesaba No. 10 stored awaiting restoration.

=== DSR No. 78 ===
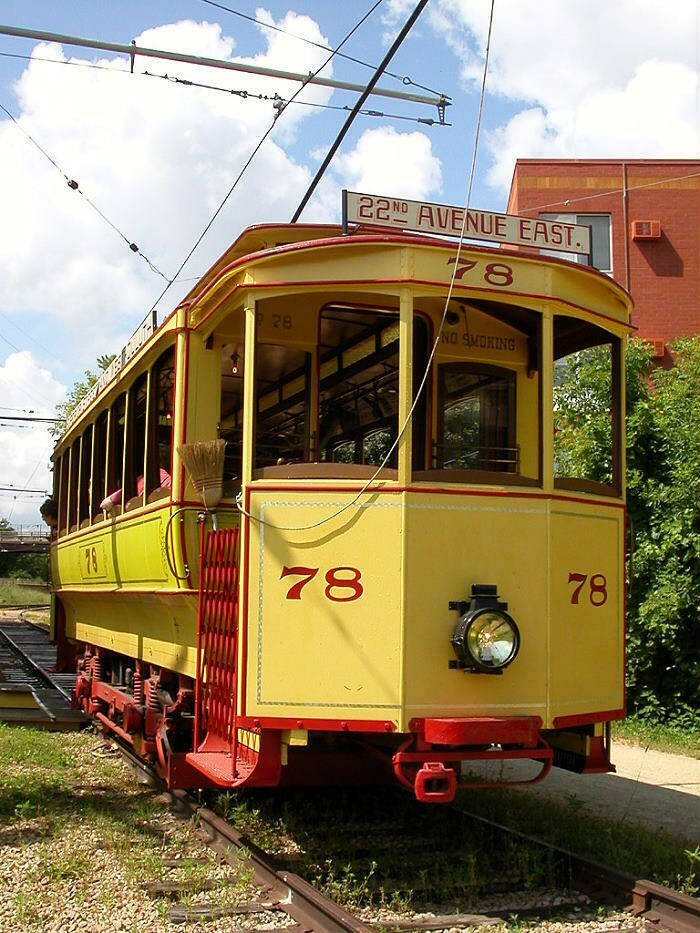
Duluth Street Railway No. 78

Returned to service in 1991 after a seven-year restoration, Duluth Street Railway Company No. 78 is the oldest streetcar in the museum, having been built by LaClede Car Company of Saint Louis, Missouri in 1893. The car, which was retired in 1911, is one of the oldest working streetcars in the country. It is a first-generation electric car that resembles the horse-drawn streetcars which it replaced. It has been operating on the Excelsior Streetcar Line since 1999.

=== DSR No. 265 ===
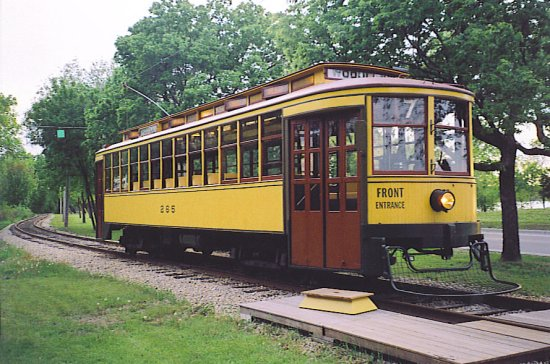
Duluth Street Railway No. 265

DSR 265 was built in the Twin Cities by TCRT as No. 1791, but was sold to Duluth the next year. It operated there until Duluth's streetcar system was abandoned in 1939. The car was then sold and converted into a summer cabin in Solon Springs, Wisconsin, a fate that was not unusual for old wooden streetcars that managed to escape being destroyed as streetcar lines were discontinued. The interior had been removed, so important pieces like the railroad trucks, the electric wiring and other parts had to be scavenged from other old streetcars or built from scratch.

== Preserved rolling stock ==
The Minnesota Streetcar Museum has six operable streetcars, three from TCRT, two from the Duluth Street Railway Company, and a streetcar from Winona, Minnesota. The museum also owns a Fargo-Moorhead Birney streetcar and a high-speed Mesaba Railway interurban car.

Electric streetcars and details
Name	Image	Built	Builder	Line and status	Notes
TCRT No. 1300		1908	Twin City Rapid Transit Company	Como-Harriet, operational	Donated to Minnesota Railfan's Association at the end of streetcar operations in 1954
DSL No. 265		1915	Twin City Rapid Transit Company	Como-Harriet, operational	Retired 1939; acquired 1973, operational since 1982; ex-TCRT No. 1791
TCRT No. 322		1946	St. Louis Car Company	Como-Harriet, operational	Withdrawn 1953; acquired 1990, operational since 2000; Operated for the Newark City Subway as No. 3 (1953–1978), and later for RTA Rapid Transit as No. 3 (1978–1990); Post-war PCC streetcar
DSL No. 78		1893	LaClede Car Company	Excelsior, operational	Retired 1911; acquired 1971, operational since 1991; Transferred from the Como-Harriet Streetcar Line for the grand opening of the Excelsior Streetcar Line in 1999
TCRT No. 1239		1907	Twin City Rapid Transit Company	Excelsior, operational	Retired 1953; acquired 1987, operational since 2004
Mississippi Valley Public Service No. 10		1913	St. Louis Car Company	Excelsior, operational	Retired 1938; acquired 1999, operational since 2016; Operated in Winona, Minnesota and was the last streetcar to run in the city
Mesaba Railway No. 10		1912	Niles Car and Manufacturing Company	Excelsior, undergoing restoration	Retired 1927; acquired 1978; Operated in interurban service between Hibbing and Gilbert, Minnesota
Fargo & Moorhead Street Railway No. 28		1923	American Car Company	Remotely stored, awaiting restoration	Retired 1937; acquired 2003; Operated in Fargo, North Dakota and Moorhead, Minnesota

== See also ==
Other places with Twin City Rapid Transit hardware:

- Seashore Trolley Museum
- East Troy Electric Railroad Museum
- San Francisco Municipal Railway's Market Street Railway

Transit in Minnesota:

- Twin City Rapid Transit – original streetcars and bus lines in the Twin Cities
- Metro Transit (Minnesota) – current LRT and bus company in the Twin Cities
