= Lyndale Railway Company =

Former railroad in Minnesota

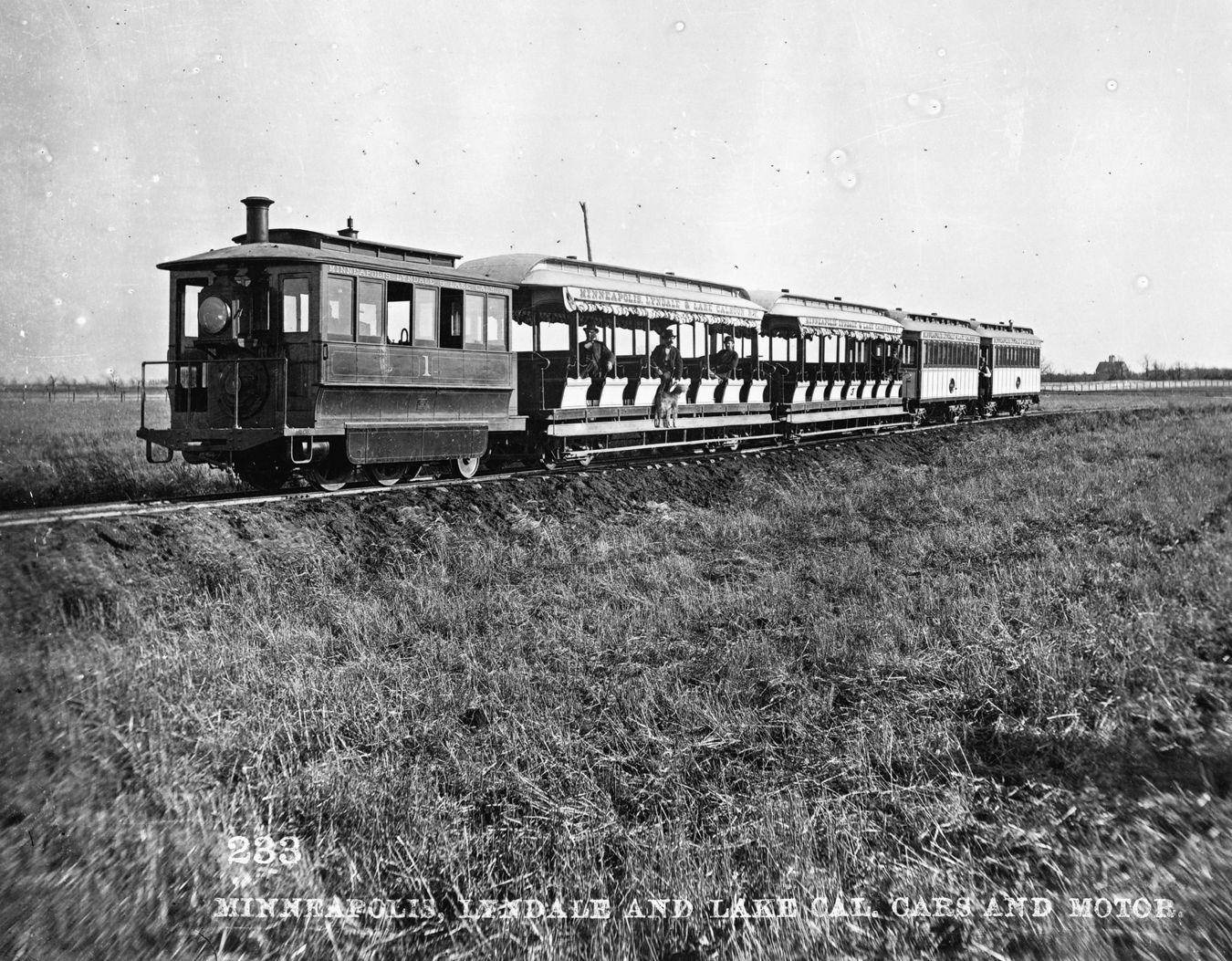
Cars and 'motor' of the Minneapolis, Lyndale and Lake Calhoun Railway

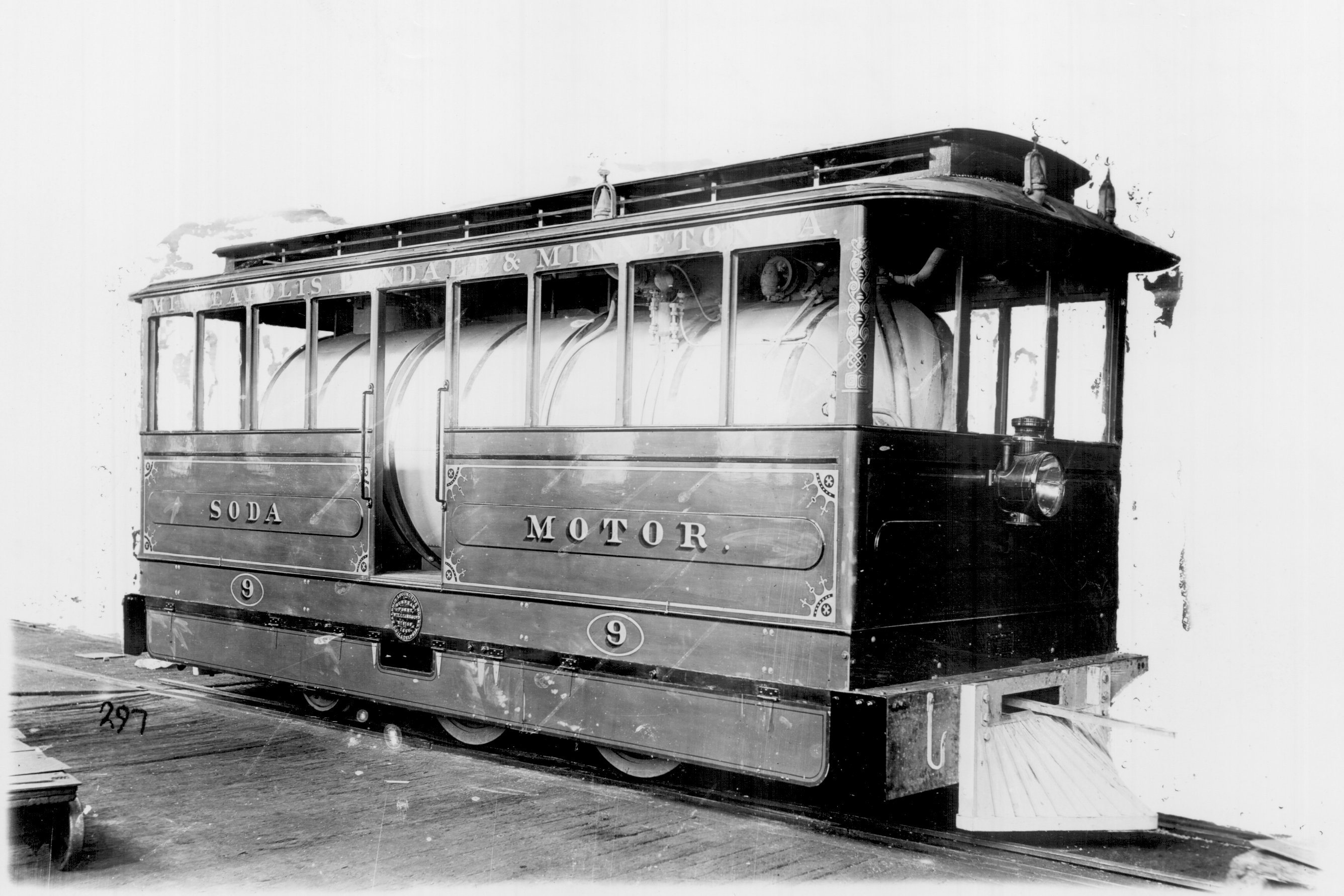
'soda motor' of the Minneapolis, Lyndale, and Minnetonka Railway

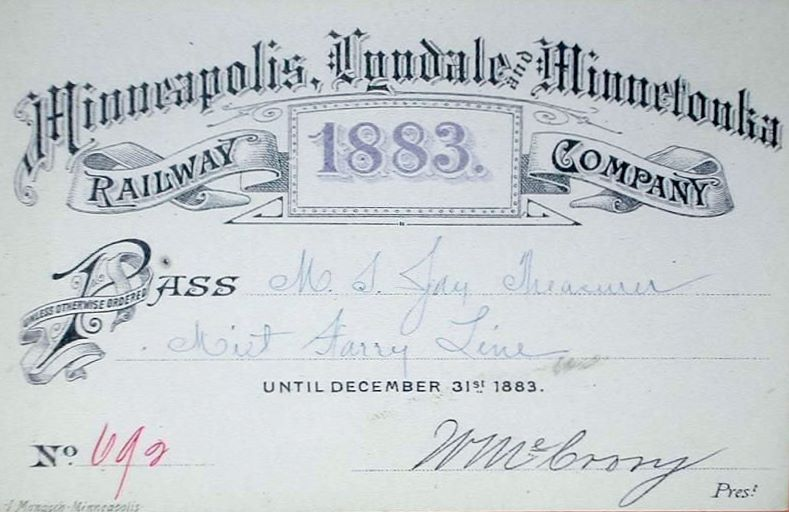
1883 Pass of Minneapolis, Lyndale and Minnetonka Railway Company

The Lyndale Railway Company later renamed the Minneapolis, Lyndale, & Minnetonka Railway Company operated the Minneapolis, Lyndale and Lake Calhoun railway, also known as the Motor Line.

== History ==
The Lyndale Railway Company built a railroad, which began at First Avenue and Nicollet Avenue in downtown Minneapolis and led west along present day 31st Street across Hennepin Avenue, turned then southwest and ended at Lake Calhoun. West of Hennepin Avenue the line ran on a curving private right of way. The company also built a pavilion on the banks of the lake near the terminus of the railroad.

The 4.5-mile-long (7.2 km), 3 ft (914 mm) narrow gauge line was inaugurated in 1879. Two 0-4-2 steam engines enclosed in streetcar-like wooden bodies towed short trains along the track. In 1880, the line was extended to Lake Harriet and in July 1882 to Excelsior on Lake Minnetonka. It provided transportation for the tourists that wanted to relax at the shores of the lakes.

In December 1885, the company experimented with electrification using a system from Charles Van Depoele, but decided that this was not yet mature enough, because the electric motors in the prototype vehicles vibrated heavily and due to other mechanical problems. In 1886, the railroad began running soda motors manufactured by Baldwin Locomotive Works in Philadelphia, reportedly the first (and possibly the only) such engines to be built in the United States, it seems that others may have been imported previously for use along elevated rail lines in New York City.

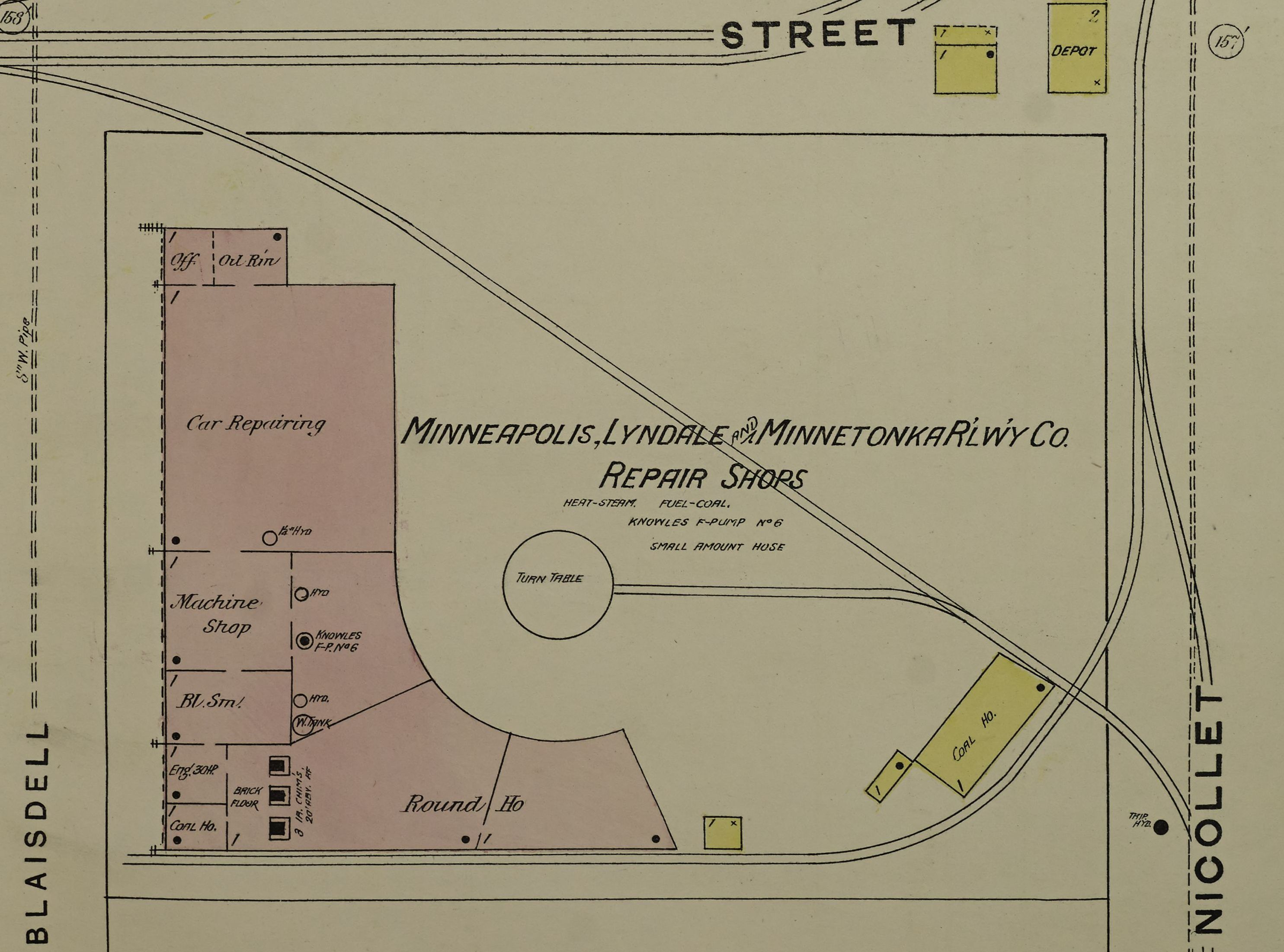
Minneapolis, Lyndale and Minnetonka Railway Company repair shops map in 1889 Minneapolis

The company, however, was never profitable, and when the lake tourist traffic declined, it was sold in 1886 to James J. Hill's St. Paul, Minneapolis, & Manitoba, a predecessor of the Great Northern Railway. The track was re-gauged to standard gauge and extended to Hutchinson, but the line from Lake Harriet to Hopkins was taken out of service. The steam locomotives were unpopular in the city, which reduced the profitability further so that it was leased in 1887 to the Minneapolis Street Railway. Service was further trimmed back to Lake Calhoun and the Lake Harriet-Excelsior line was abandoned.

== Literature ==
Munn, M. D.: Articles of incorporation, by-laws, and ordinances of the Twin city rapid transit co., Minneapolis street railway co., Minneapolis & St. Paul suburban railway co., St. Paul city railway co. 1899 (catalog entry).

== See also ==
- Como-Harriet Streetcar Line
