= Bridge No. L-4646 =

- U.S. National Register of Historic Places
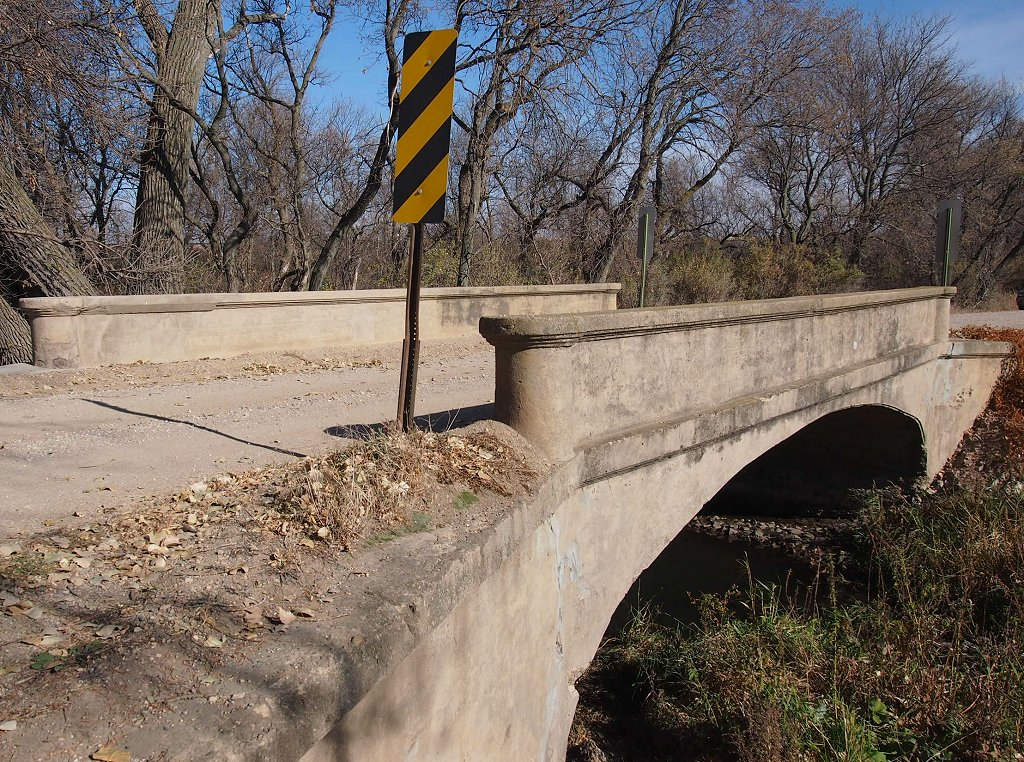

- Location within Minnesota
- Location: Sixth St. over Spring Brook, Beaver Creek, Minnesota
- Coordinates: 43°36′55″N 96°21′34″W
- Area: less than one acre
- Built: 1911
- Built by: Perley N. Gillham
- Architectural style: Reinforced-concrete bridge
- MPS: Reinforced-Concrete Highway Bridges in Minnesota MPS
- NRHP reference No.: 89001844
- Added to NRHP: November 6, 1989

Bridge No. L-4646 is a reinforced concrete arch bridge that spans Spring Brook in the city of Beaver Creek, Minnesota. It is a single-span bridge measuring 38 feet (12 m) in length, with a span length of 32.1 feet (9.8 m) and a deck width of 18.7 feet (5.7 m). The bridge, built in 1911, was listed on the National Register of Historic Places in 1989.

The bridge's builder, Perley N. Gillham, was born in Wisconsin in 1855 and eventually moved to Luverne, Minnesota, the county seat of Rock County. He helped build the Rock County Courthouse and Jail and built the Luverne Carnegie Library. Gillham built a number of reinforced concrete arch bridges around the turn of the 20th century, at a time when bridge builders were still experimenting with reinforced concrete and before the state of Minnesota gained control over much bridge building. He may have worked with William S. Hewett of Minneapolis on the Melan Bridge in Rock Rapids, Iowa, a short distance from Luverne, and the two may have exchanged information about reinforced concrete bridge building. Gillham also erected Bridge No. L-2162 nearby.
