= Soda locomotive =

Fireless locomotive

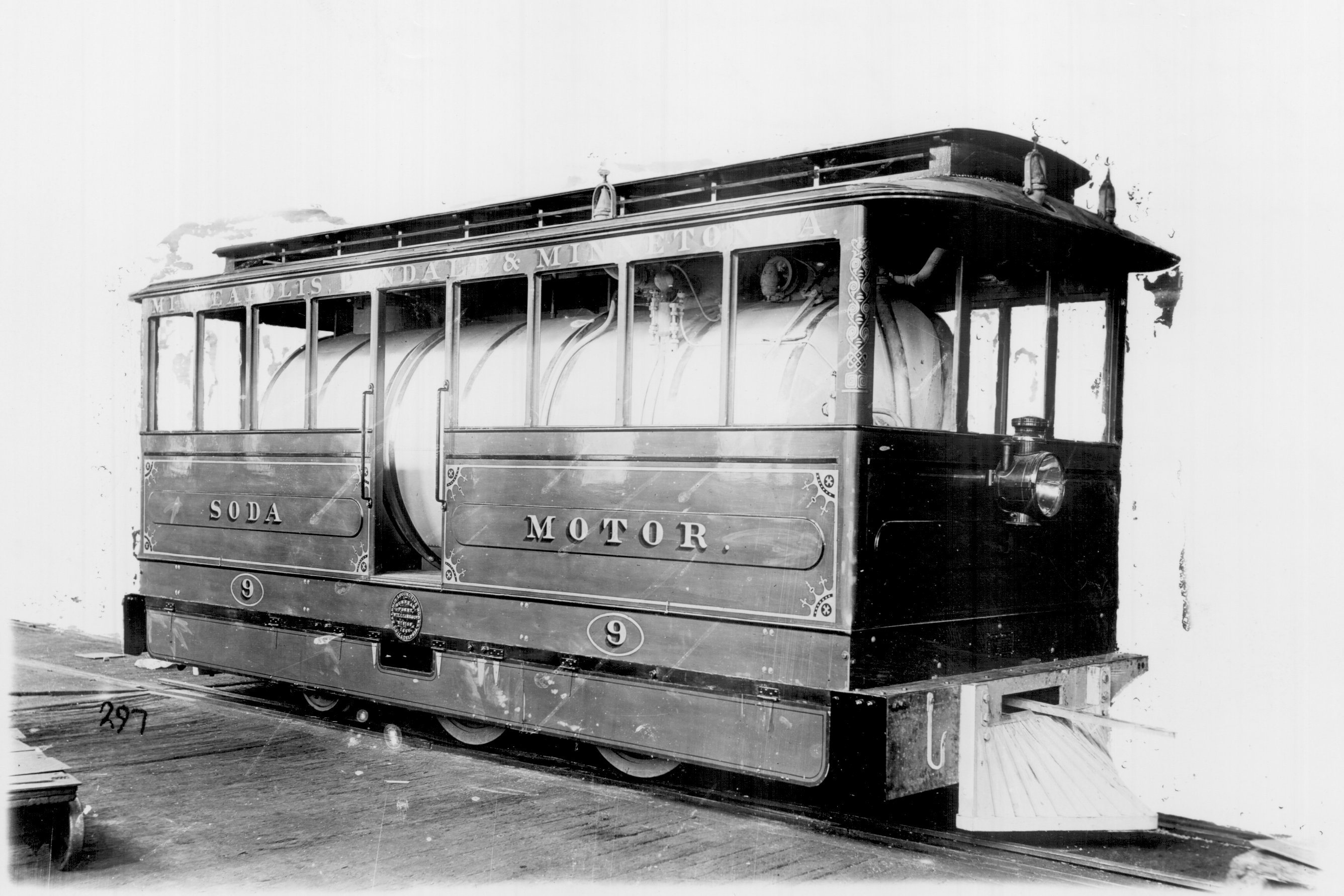
Soda motor of the Minneapolis, Lyndale and Minnetonka Railway

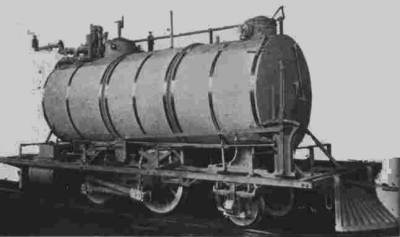
Internals of a soda-powered tramcar of the Minneapolis, Lyndale and Minnetonka Railway Company

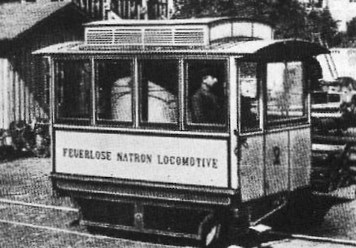
Honigmann caustic soda locomotive in Aachen, Germany, 1884

Soda locomotives were a variant of fireless locomotives, in which steam was raised in a boiler, expanded through cylinders in the usual way, and then condensed in a tank of caustic soda that surrounded the boiler. Dissolving water in caustic soda liberated heat, which generated more steam from the boiler, until the caustic soda became too dilute to release heat at a useful temperature.

== Technical description ==
These closed-loop steam engines had no firebox. The boiler was jacketed by a container loaded with about 5 tons of caustic soda (sodium hydroxide). When water or steam came in contact with the caustic soda, it would generate heat—enough to actually run the boiler and generate more steam. Steam emanating from the boiler would be fed through pistons to propel the locomotive forward, and the exhaust steam from the pistons would be fed into the caustic soda to continue the cycle. These vehicles were virtually silent, because the steam was not released into the atmosphere.

A soda locomotive could run for several hours, but eventually the soda would become diluted and wouldn't produce enough heat to continue generating steam. For reconcentrating, the caustic soda was either transferred out of the boiler of the locomotive and boiled in open vats, or, rather more conveniently, by injecting superheated steam at a high enough temperature to boil off the water in solution. A stationary boiler would be hooked up and feed superheated steam through the soda to boil off the water and effectively recharge the soda.

These locomotives were always called "soda locomotives" (sodium carbonate) although "caustic soda locomotives" (sodium hydroxide) would be a more precise description. The misleading terminology was most likely used to increase their acceptance by the public.

Other salts such as calcium chloride could also be used.

== Locomotives ==
- The Perkins calcium chloride engine, 1864
- The Spence caustic soda boiler, 1874
- The Honigmann caustic soda locomotive, 1885
- The Baldwin soda motors, 1886
