= William S. Hewett =

American bridge designer (died 1951)

William Sherman Hewett
- W.S. Hewett & Co Builders Name Plate
- Born: South Hope, Maine, U.S.
- Died: November 20, 1951 (aged 87); St. Petersburg, Florida, U.S.
- Resting place: Lakewood Cemetery
- Occupation: Engineer
- Known for: Bridge Building
- Children: 5

William S. Hewett (died November 20, 1951) was a major bridge contractor in the Minneapolis area from the 1890s until well into the 20th century. His firm designed and built a number of bridges for the Twin City Rapid Transit Company when it was electrifying and expanding its system around the turn of the 20th century.

== Reinforced concrete bridges ==
Bridges built by Hewett's firm used included some of the earliest reinforced concrete bridges built using the Melan system invented by Viennese engineer Josef Melan and patented in the United States in 1894. Hewett probably became familiar with the Melan system when working with his uncle's construction firm in northwest Iowa. Hewett's firm also designed Bridges No. L-5853 and 92247 in Como Park in Saint Paul, Minnesota. These two bridges also crossed the Twin City Rapid Transit line.

Hewett performed other pioneering work with reinforced concrete and prestressed concrete. In 1907, he formed the Security Bridge Company, and he established Hewett Systems in 1913.

Hewett also built the reinforced concrete Washburn Water Tower in Minneapolis.

== Other bridges ==
Other bridges built by Hewett include:

- Bridge No. 1482, Luverne, Minnesota (1908)
- Colton's Crossing Bridge, Lisbon, North Dakota (1907)
- Forsyth Bridge, Forsyth, Montana (1905)
- Interlachen Bridge, Minneapolis, Minnesota (1900)
- Joliet Bridge, Joliet, Montana (1901)
- Melan Bridge, Rock Rapids, Iowa (1893)
- Old Yankton Bridge, Sioux Falls, South Dakota (1895)
- South Dakota Dept. of Transportation Bridge No. 25-380-142, Zell, South Dakota (1902)
- Walnut Street Bridge, Mazeppa, Minnesota (1904)

== Personal life ==
Hewett had three daughters and two sons, Mrs. E. H. Cahill, Mrs. Pauline Paine, Mrs. L. M. Addington, M. W. and Harold.

Hewett left Minneapolis in 1932. He moved to Evanston, Illinois, and later to St. Petersburg, Florida. He died on November 20, 1951, aged 87, in St. Petersburg. He was buried in Lakewood Cemetery in Minneapolis.
