= Mesaba Railway =

Overview
- Locale: Minnesota

Technical
- Line length: 36 mi (58 km)
- Track gauge: 1,435 mm (4 ft 8 1/2 in) standard gauge
- Electrification: 750 V DC

The Mesaba Railway was the first and only interurban electric transportation system on the Mesabi Range, with its inaugural run on December 24, 1912. The track covered 36 miles (58 km) between Gilbert, Minnesota and Hibbing, Minnesota, with six cars offering hourly service between 6 a.m. and midnight, seven days a week. The cars could travel at speeds up to 40 miles per hour (64 km/h) and offered passengers such modern conveniences as heat, smoking cars, and toilets.

The introduction of the Mesaba Railway changed life on the Iron Range. The emergence of the interurban marked the beginning of the end for other forms of transportation including "livery stables, horses and buggies." People now had more choices of where to live, shop, and find entertainment. Prior to its introduction, public transportation was practically non-existent and limited to horse and buggy, railroad transportation, and a few cars for the more affluent. A majority of the population lived in mining locations, which were small communities built near the mining operations, where one could easily walk from place to place.

The last interurban passenger car operated on April 16, 1927. The Mesaba Railway Company was sold to Northland Transportation Company (later incorporated as Greyhound Lines in 1930). The railway company went into receivership on March 7, 1924, and was sold in December 1927. All of the offices and equipment were sold to the Minnesota State Highway Department.
