= Como-Harriet Streetcar Line =

Como-Harriet Streetcar Line (CHSL)
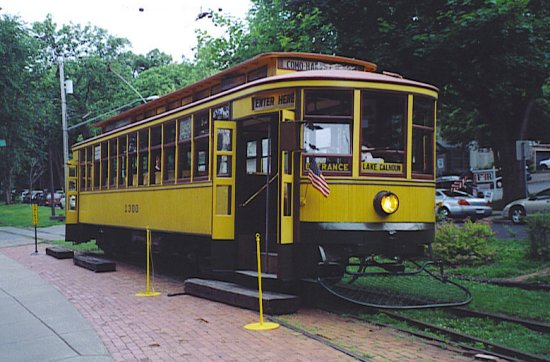
- Twin City Rapid Transit No. 1300

Overview
- Owner: Minnesota Streetcar Museum (cars), Minneapolis (right-of-way)
- Locale: Minneapolis, Minnesota
- Termini: Lake Harriet; Bde Maka Ska
- Stations: 1

Service
- Type: Heritage streetcar
- System: Minnesota Streetcar Museum ex-TCRT
- Operator: Minnesota Streetcar Museum
- Rolling stock: TCRT and PCC streetcars from old TCRT system

History
- Opened: August 28, 1971

Technical
- Character: right-of-way
- Track gauge: 4 ft 8 1/2 in (1,435 mm) standard gauge
- Electrification: Overhead lines

- Como-Harriet Streetcar Line and Trolley
- U.S. National Register of Historic Places
- Minneapolis Landmark
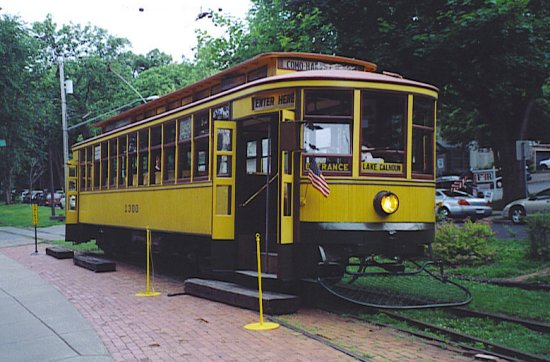
- Twin City Rapid Transit No. 1300
- Location: Minneapolis, MN
- Coordinates: 44°55′58.91″N 93°18′29.53″W
- Built: 1898
- Architect: Minneapolis Street Railway Co.; Twin City Rapid Transit
- NRHP reference No.: 77000739

Significant dates
- Added to NRHP: October 17, 1977
- Designated MPLSL: 1986

The Como-Harriet Streetcar Line (CHSL) is a heritage streetcar line in Minneapolis, Minnesota, which follows original streetcar right-of-way between Lake Harriet and Bde Maka Ska and is operated by the Minnesota Streetcar Museum. The heritage line was originally developed in the 1970s by the Minnesota Transportation Museum which spun off streetcar operations in the winter of 2004–2005.

== Heritage line history ==
When Twin City Rapid Transit ceased streetcar operations in 1954, it donated two of its locally-built wooden streetcars to railfan groups. One of the groups receiving a streetcar (TCRT No. 1300) was the Minnesota Railfans Association, which organized railfan trips from the 1940s to the 1960s. TCRT No. 1300 was stored outside until it was acquired by the Minnesota Transportation Museum in 1962, when restoration began. By 1963, the car had been restored to operational status. It originally made only short trips along track at and near a roundhouse in St. Paul owned by the Minnesota Transfer Railway. Because there were no overhead electric lines at this location, the streetcar was powered by an electric generator behind the car. Despite these challenges, the car was extremely popular with the public.

Since public interest was so high, the museum examined options for regular operation of No. 1300. The City of Minneapolis and the Minneapolis Park and Recreation Board had acquired the original streetcar right-of-way between Lake Harriet and Lakewood Cemetery near Lake Calhoun (now known as Bde Maka Ska) and in 1970 the Minnesota Transportation Museum leased the land.

On August 28, 1971, after track had been laid and a small carbarn constructed under the Queen Avenue Bridge, which passed over the original right-of-way, public operations began. Because no overhead wires had been strung to provide electricity, the trailer-mounted electrical generator continued to be used until the overhead electrical system was completed in 1973.

Continued popularity of the heritage line allowed the museum to expand from about one city block of track in 1971 to more than one mile of track. By 2005 continuous use had taken its toll on the track and a rebuilding project funded by a federal TEA-21 grant took place. Over time more streetcars were acquired and restored by the museum. Three streetcars are operated on the Como-Harriet line, although only one or two are run at any given time. The line is listed on the National Register of Historic Places.

== Linden Hills Station ==
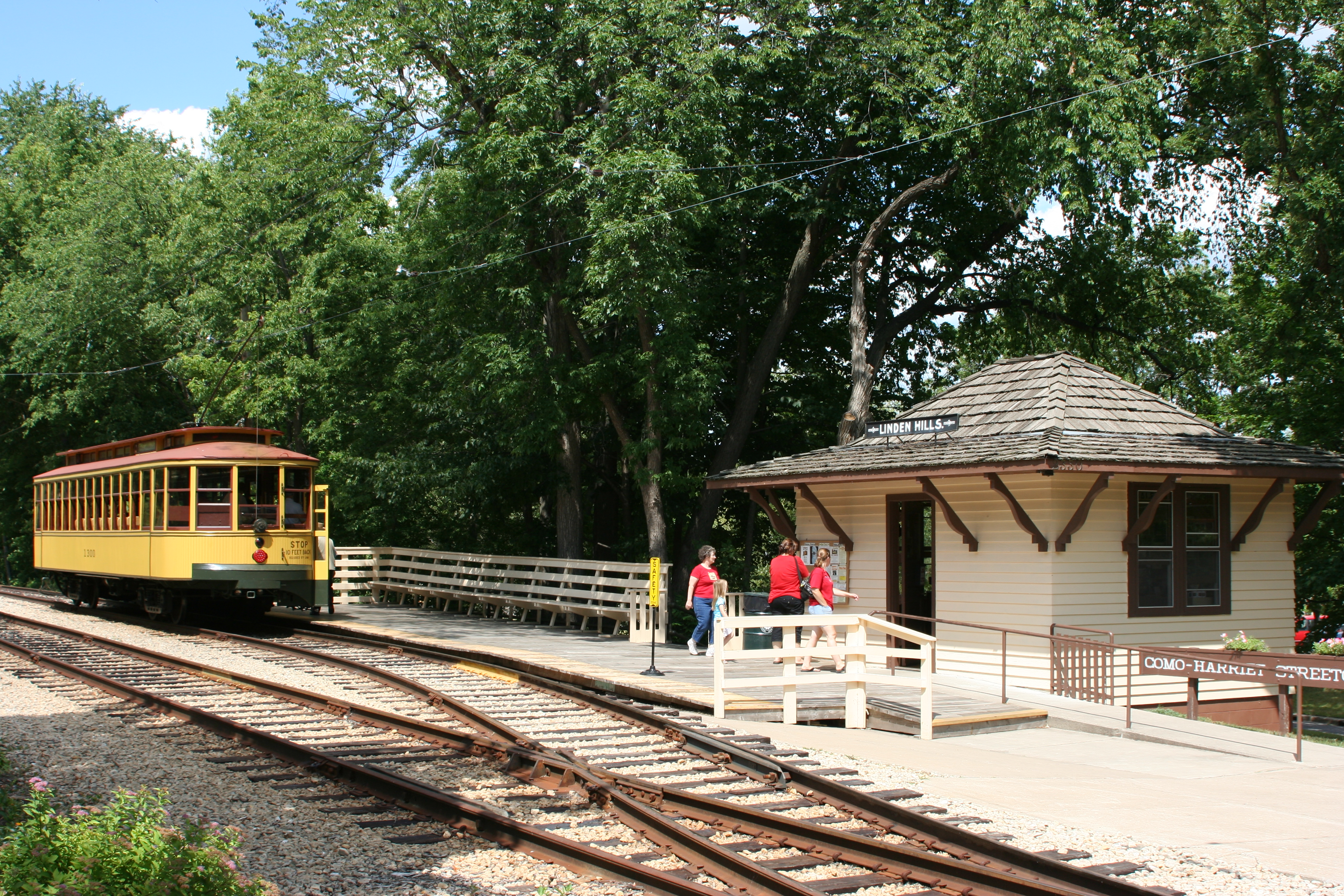
TCRT 1300 at the recreated Linden Hills Depot

The original streetcar station at Linden Hills was built one block north of the intersection of Queen Ave and 42nd Street in 1900. As time progressed TCRT desired to make Lake Harriet an entertainment destination in an effort to increase recreational ridership. At this time the company built the original Lake Harriet Bandshell and began sponsoring concerts at the lake. Because of the larger crowds being drawn to the attraction, there was a need for a larger station, and in 1914 a larger chalet-style structure replaced the original building, which was moved closer to the lake and used for other purposes. The chalet station existed until 1954 when streetcar operations ceased, at which time it was torn down.

By the time the Minnesota Transportation Museum began construction of the heritage line, all that remained was the concrete slab used as a platform for loading and unloading passengers. In 1990, the museum built a recreation of the smaller original Linden Hills Station. Today, the station is used for purchasing tokens to ride the streetcars, souvenir sales and the display of Twin City Lines history.

== Rolling stock ==
=== TCRT No. 1300 ===
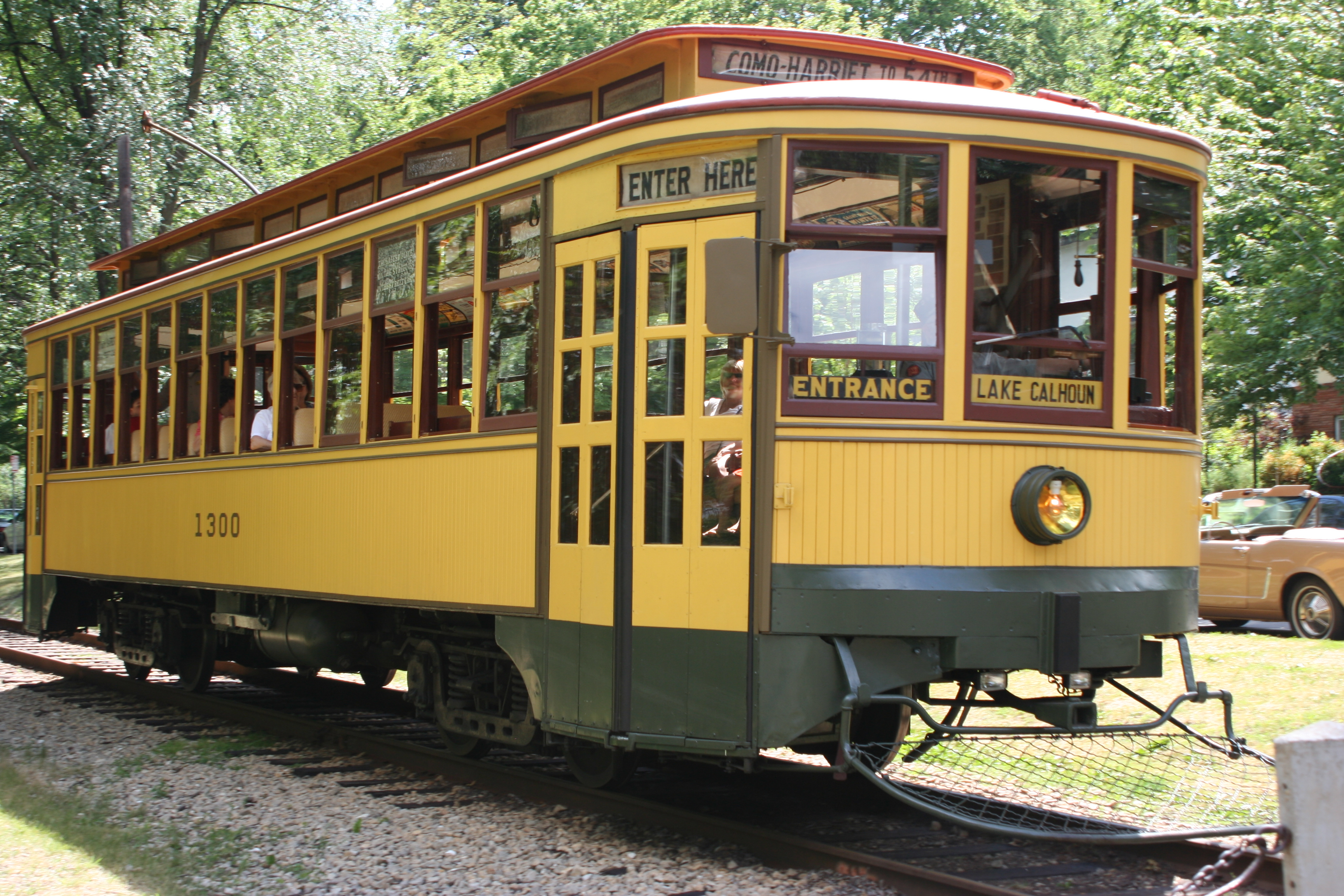
Twin City Rapid Transit No. 1300

The first streetcar operated by the museum was Twin City Rapid Transit Company streetcar No. 1300. The car, which now appears much like it did in the 1930s-1950s era, was built by Twin City Rapid Transit as a fast interurban streetcar in 1908, with a top speed of about 35 miles per hour (56.35 km/h). When in operation for Twin City Lines TCRT No. 1300 was based at the East Minneapolis Station (carbarn) and often operated on the original Como-Harriet route.

In 2003, TCRT No. 1300 underwent extensive overhauling of its internal wiring, exterior, and internal wood and steel support structure as it hadn't had a major overhaul/rebuilding since the late 1940s. This was done for preparation for its 100th birthday in 2008.

=== TCRT No. 1239 ===
Twin City Rapid Transit No. 1239

TCRT No. 1239 was built at the 31st Street Shops in Minneapolis and has been restored to the configuration it had when it was constructed in 1907 with a private door to the motorman's cab in the front and double (later triple) stream wire gates for passenger access in the rear. This configuration required "two-man" operation, with a motorman in front who operated the streetcar, including opening and closing the gates, and a conductor at the rear who collected fares and helped with backing when necessary.

Many TCRT streetcars were converted to one-man/two-man operation in the 1930s by adding double-stream folding front doors and replacing the rear gates with similar doors. This gave TCRT the option to operate the car with only a motorman ("one man" operation), or, on busier routes, with a conductor and a motorman ("two man" operation). Because streetcar ridership remained high on many routes until the end of service in 1954, many "gate cars" with single-stream front folding doors remained in service until the end. TCRT No. 1239 returned to service in September 2004.

=== TCRT PCC No. 322 ===
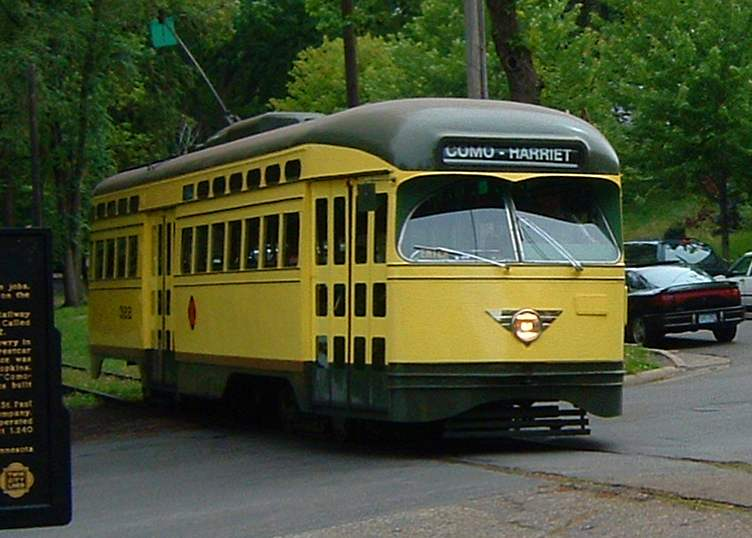
Twin City Lines PCC car No. 322

TCRT built most of its own streetcars in its own shops (31st Street in Minneapolis from 1898 through 1907 and Snelling in St. Paul from 1907 through the late 1920s). But a number of faster and more modern streamlined vehicles were purchased in the 1940s to better compete with the growing prevalence of the automobile. TCRT No. 322 was a Presidents' Conference Committee, or PCC streetcar built by the St. Louis Car Company in 1946. It operated in the Twin Cities until it was sold in 1953 to Public Service Coordinated Transit in New Jersey, one of thirty streetcars purchased for use in the Newark City Subway. It was later sold to the Shaker Heights Rapid Transit in Cleveland, Ohio in 1978 to replace two wreck-damaged cars. After the car was acquired by the museum in 1990, it underwent ten years of restoration, entering service in 2000.

== See also ==
- Twin City Rapid Transit
- Minnesota Streetcar Museum
- Lyndale Railway Company
