= Laclede Car Company =

Laclede Car Company was founded in 1883 by William Sutton and Emil Alexander, who later founded the American Car Company and worked at Brownell Car Company in St. Louis, Missouri, United States.

The company was a short-lived electric streetcar builder. It was located at 4500 North Second Street. It was bought out by St. Louis Car Company in 1903.
