= Bridge No. L-2162 =

Historic bridge in southwestern Minnesota

- U.S. National Register of Historic Places
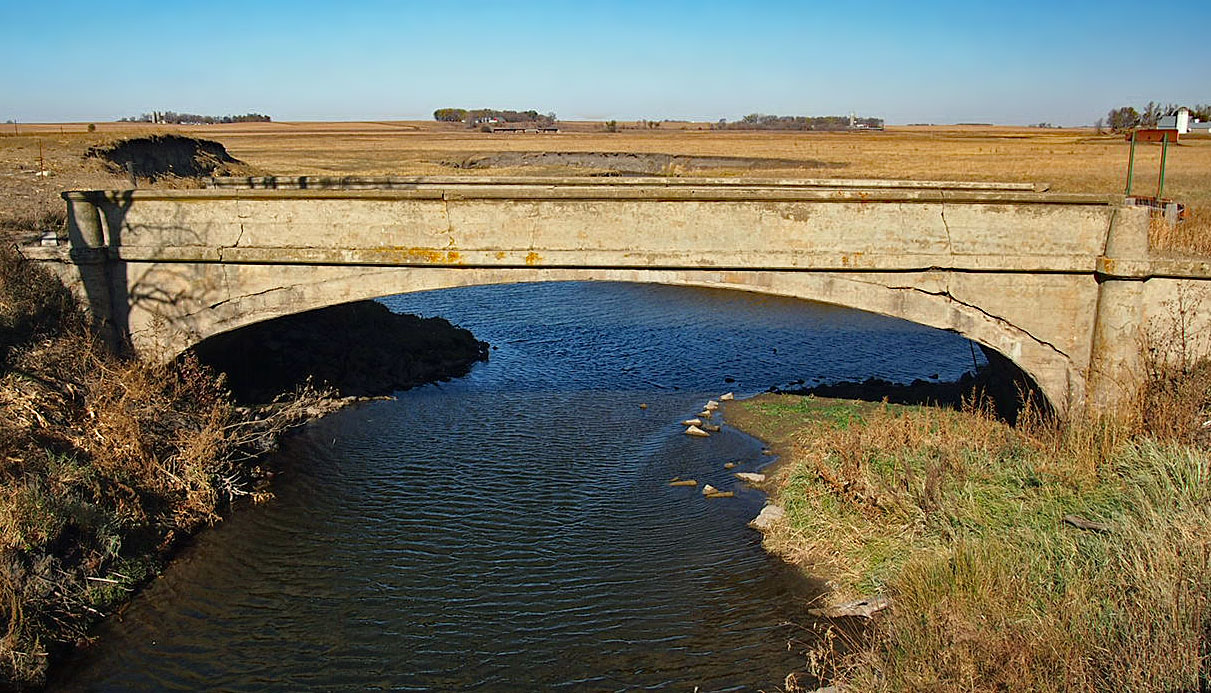

- Location within Minnesota
- Nearest city: Jasper, Minnesota
- Coordinates: 43°46′46″N 96°25′54″W
- Area: less than one acre
- Built: 1907
- Architect: Perley N. Gillham
- Architectural style: Reinforced-concrete bridge
- MPS: Reinforced-Concrete Highway Bridges in Minnesota MPS
- NRHP reference No.: 89001839
- Added to NRHP: November 6, 1989

Bridge No. L-2162 is a reinforced concrete single-span deck arch bridge in Rose Dell Township, Minnesota, close to the South Dakota border. The bridge is 64 feet (20 m) long, with a span length of 56 feet (17 m) and a width of 18.6 feet (5.7 m). It contains some Classical Revival design elements in the coping, molding, and end posts. The bridge was designed by Perley N. Gillham, who stamped his name on the west railing along with the names of township board members and two county commissioners, and built in 1907. It was listed on the National Register of Historic Places in 1989.

Gillham was a prominent bridge builder in Rock County and neighboring Nobles County. Bridge No. L-2162 is the largest of Gillham's arch bridges in the county, as measured by span length and overall structure length. It is also the largest known reinforced-concrete arch bridge in Minnesota built prior to 1910. Gillham was also the superintendent of construction for the Rock County Courthouse in 1887 and won the contract for construction of a new county jail in 1900. Bridge L-2162 is no longer in use, because the roadway that once crossed it was moved slightly to the east.

== See also ==
- Bridge No. L-4646
