= Josef Melan =

Austrian engineer

- Born: 1854; Austrian Empire
- Died: 1941 (aged 86–87)
- Engineering career
- Projects: Dragon Bridge

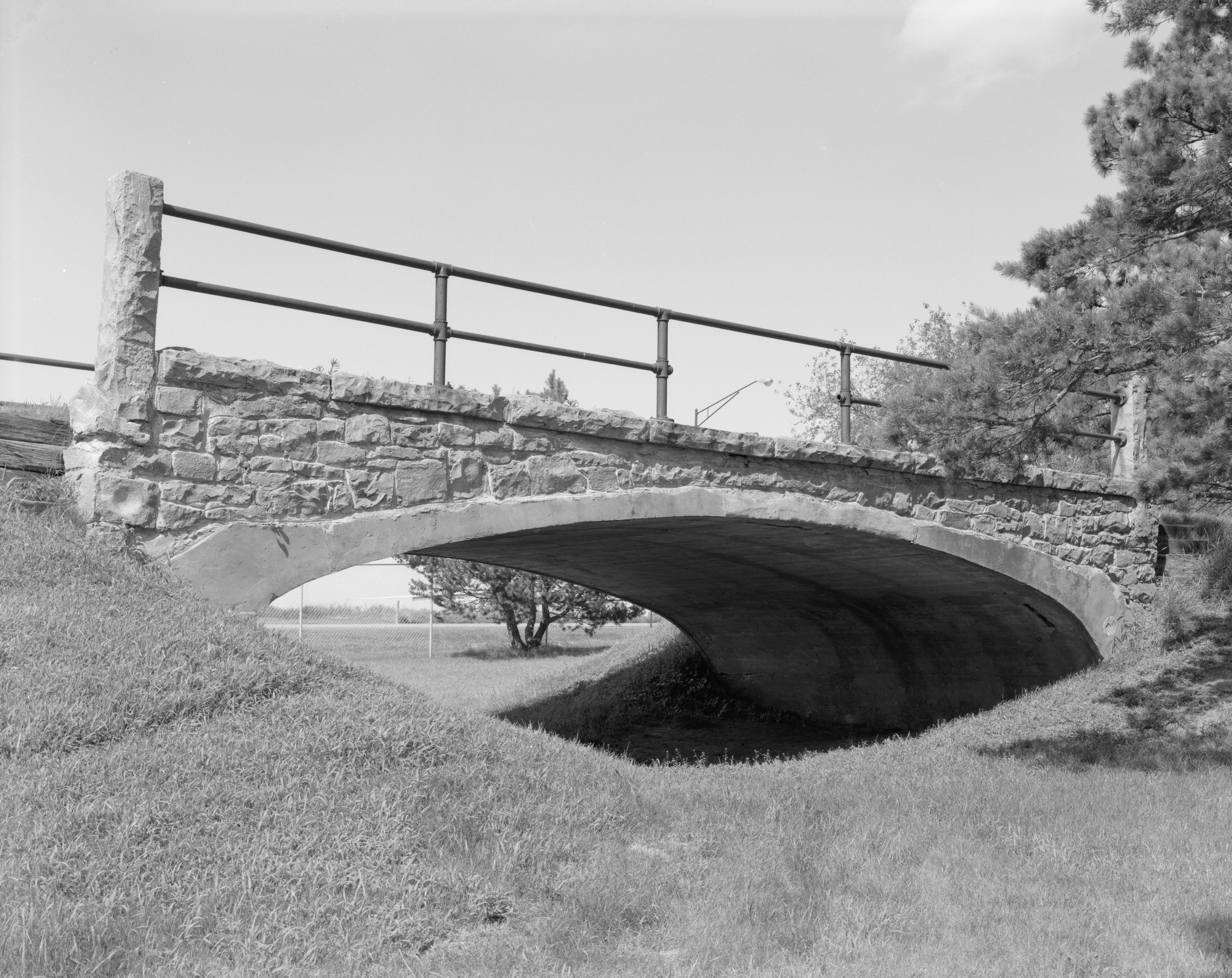
An American example of a Melan bridge

Josef Melan (1854–1941) was an Austrian engineer. He is regarded as one of the most important pioneers of reinforced concrete bridge-building at the end of the 19th century. Josef Melan is credited as the inventor of the Melan System, a method for the construction of reinforced bridges. The Melan System differed from previous reinforced bridges because Melan did not build iron bars into the reinforced concrete bridge structure, but used rigid truss arches made of iron. Melan became famous in 1898 after building a 42.4 m bridge with a very shallow arch in Steyr. At that time, this was the largest reinforced concrete bridge in the world. He also built the Dragon Bridge in Ljubljana.

== Biography ==
Josef Melan studied civil engineering at TU Wien from 1869 to 1874 and thereafter was an assistant to Emil Winkler at the Chair of Railway Engineering and Bridge-Building. Melan wrote his habilitation thesis on the theory of bridges and railways at the same university in 1880 and remained on the teaching staff there until 1886. It was during this period that he also worked in the design offices of the Ignaz Gridl bridge-building company and for the building contractor Gaertner – both based in Vienna. He was appointed associate professor of structural mechanics and graphical statics at German Technical University in Brno in 1886, where he was promoted to full professor at the same chair in 1890 before switching to the Chair of Bridge-Building in 1895. He was head of the Chair of Bridge-Building at the Deutsche Technische Hochschule Prag (founded 1717) in Prague from 1902 until his transfer to emeritus status in 1923.

Josef Melan was the outstanding authority on the theory and practice of bridge-building in Austria during the transition from the discipline-formation period to the consolidation period of theory of structures. The Melan System, which links steel and concrete construction, won significant market-shares in European and American bridge-building as early as the 1890s and was awarded a gold medal at the World Exposition in Paris in 1900. Melan had published his work on concrete arches in conjunction with iron arches in 1893. Melan became famous in 1898 after building a 42.4 m bridge with a very shallow arch in Steyr. At that time, this was the largest reinforced concrete bridge in the world. He also built the Dragon Bridge in Ljubljana.

However, it was not only in composite construction, but also in the field of steel bridge-building that Melan set standards. In 1888 he was the first person to quantify the effects of second-order theory. His books on bridges enjoyed international popularity. For example, in 1913 the American bridge-builder David B. Steinman translated Melan's theory of arch and suspension bridges. Melan also verified the calculations for the Williams Bridge on behalf of the New York Bridges Department and the Hell Gate Bridge for the New York-based Gustav Lindenthal bridges office. His influence on the theory and practice of large bridges in the US during the first two decades of the 20th century is without precedent.

== Works ==
- Beitrag zur Berechnung eiserner Hallen-Gespärre, in:. Wochenschrift des Österreichischen Ingenieur- und Architekten-Vereines 8 (1883), pp. 149–150 & 162–165. (in German)
- Ueber den Einfluss der Wärme auf elastische Systeme, in: Wochenschrift des Österreichischen Ingenieur- und Architekten-Vereines 8 (1883), pp. 183–184 & 202. (in German)
- Beitrag zur Berechnung statisch unbestimmter Stabsysteme, in: Zeitschrift des Österreichischen Ingenieur- und Architekten-Vereines 36 (1884), pp. 100–108. (in German)
- Theorie der eisernen Bogenbrücken und der Hängebrücken. In: Der Brückenbau. Handbuch der Ingenieurwissenschaften II. Band. Vierte Abteilung. Eiserne Bogenbrücken und Hängebrücken, ed. by J. Melan & T. Schäffer, publ. by T. Schäffer & E. Sonne, 2nd ed, pp. 1–144. Leipzig: Engelmann 1888. (in German)
- Theorie des Gewölbes und des Eisenbetongewölbes im besonderen. In: Handbuch für Eisenbetonbau. Erster Band: Entwicklungsgeschichte und Theorie des Eisenbetons, ed. by F. v. Emperger, pp. 387–449. Berlin: Wilhelm Ernst & Sohn 1908. (in German)
- Theory of Arches and Suspension Bridges. Trans. into English by Prof. Dr. Steinman. Chicago: The Myron Clark Publ. Co. 1913.

Plain and reinforced concrete arches. Trans. into English by Prof. Dr. Steinman. New York: Wiley 1915.
