= List of county roads in Goodhue County, Minnesota =

- Standard county road markers

Highway names
- Interstates: Interstate X (I-X)
- US Highways: U.S. Highway X (US X)
- State: Trunk Highway X (MN X or TH X)
- County State-Aid Highways: County State-Aid Highway X (CSAH X)
- County roads: County Road X (CR X)

System links
- County roads of Minnesota; Goodhue County

The following is an incomplete list of county-maintained roads in Goodhue County, Minnesota, United States.

Number	Length (mi)	Length (km)	Southern or western terminus	Northern or eastern terminus	Formed	Removed	Notes
CSAH 1	36.475	58.701	Dodge County line (County 7)	US 61 in Red Wing	—	—	
CSAH 2	18.381	29.581	County 16 in Bellechester	US 61 near Frontenac	—	—	
CSAH 3	3.85	6.20	MN 58 near Hay Creek	County 2 near Belvidere Mills	—	—	
CSAH 4	12.73	20.49	MN 58 near Zumbrota	MN 58 near Hay Creek	—	—	
CSAH 5	14.65	23.58	MN 58 near Hay Creek	US 61 in Lake City	—	—	Briefly dips into Wabasha County (County 35)
CSAH 6	17.96	28.90	MN 58 at Zumbrota	MN 19 near Red Wing	—	—	
CSAH 7	22.32	35.92	US 52 at Minneola	US 61 near Welch	—	—	
CSAH 8	18.85	30.34	County 1 at Aspelund	MN 19 near Cannon Falls	—	—	
CSAH 9	31.95	51.42	Rice County line in Dennison (County 31)	Wabasha County line (County 36)	—	—	
CSAH 10	14.32	23.05	County 11 near Roscoe	Wabasha County line (County 12)	—	—	Unsigned concurrency with MN 58.
CSAH 11	27.61	44.43	County 13 near Skyberg	Wabasha County line (County 1)	—	—	
CSAH 12	17.77	28.60	Rice County line (County 19)	County 10 at Roscoe Center	—	—	
CSAH 13	5.25	8.45	Dodge County line (County 5)	MN 56 in Kenyon	—	—	
CSAH 14	12.00	19.31	County 30 at Eidsvold	US 52 near Cannon Falls	—	—	
CSAH 17	5.64	9.08	Dakota County line (County 88)	Dakota County line (County 91)	—	—	
CSAH 18	7.33	11.80	US 61 in Red Wing	Dakota County line (County 68)	—	—	
CSAH 19	2.58	4.15	US 61 in Welch Township	County 18 in Welch Township	—	—	
CSAH 20	—	—	County 24 in Cannon Falls	MN 19 / MN 20 in Cannon Falls	2014	current	Formerly a part of County 24, which moved east to end at County 25.
CSAH 21	4.617	7.430	MN 58 in Red Wing	US 61 / US 63 in Red Wing	—	—	
CSAH 24	10.47	16.85	County 9 in Wangs	MN 19 in Cannon Falls	—	—	Interchange was built at US 52 in 2014. Formerly a traffic light.
CSAH 29	0.7	1.1	MN 20 in Cannon Falls	Dakota County line (County 86)	—	—	
CSAH 64	0.59	0.95	County 9 in Goodhue	MN 58 in Goodhue	—	—	
CSAH 66	1.42	2.29	County 1 in Red Wing	Twin Bluff Road in Red Wing	—	—	
