= Claybank, Minnesota =

Unincorporated community in Minnesota, United States

Claybank
- Unincorporated community
- Location within Minnesota Location within the United States
- Coordinates: 44°26′30″N 92°37′55″W
- Country: United States
- State: Minnesota
- County: Goodhue
- Township: Goodhue
- Elevation: 1,060 ft (320 m)
- Time zone: UTC-6 (Central (CST))
  - Summer (DST): UTC-5 (CDT)
- ZIP code: 55027
- Area code: 651
- GNIS feature ID: 654645

Claybank is an unincorporated community in Goodhue Township, Goodhue County, Minnesota, United States.

The community is located near the junction of County 6 Boulevard and 350th Street. State Highway 58 (MN 58) is nearby. Nearby communities include Goodhue, Ryan, White Rock, Vasa, Belvidere Mills, and Hay Creek.

It was once a station on the former Chicago Great Western Railway between Red Wing and Rochester, Minnesota. Rail spurs extended two miles to the east to clay pits, where clay was mined and shipped by rail to the stoneware industry of Red Wing. A post office was established as Claybank in 1890, and remained in operation until 1904.
