= Bombay, Minnesota =

Unincorporated community in Minnesota, United States

Bombay
- Unincorporated community
- Location within Minnesota Location within the United States
- Coordinates: 44°17′01″N 92°53′30″W
- Country: United States
- State: Minnesota
- County: Goodhue
- Townships: Wanamingo, Cherry Grove
- Elevation: 1,171 ft (357 m)
- Time zone: UTC-6 (Central (CST))
  - Summer (DST): UTC-5 (CDT)
- ZIP code: 55983
- Area code: 507
- GNIS feature ID: 640356

Bombay is an unincorporated community in Goodhue County, Minnesota, United States.

The community is located near the junction of State Highway 60 (MN 60) and 70th Avenue.

County 1 Boulevard and County 12 Boulevard are also in the immediate area. Bombay is located within Wanamingo Township and Cherry Grove Township.

ZIP codes 55983 (Wanamingo) and 55946 (Kenyon) meet near Bombay.
