= Hader, Minnesota =

Unincorporated community in Minnesota, United States

Hader
- Unincorporated community
- Location within Minnesota Location within the United States
- Coordinates: 44°21′56″N 92°48′04″W
- Country: United States
- State: Minnesota
- County: Goodhue
- Townships: Leon, Wanamingo
- Elevation: 1,181 ft (360 m)
- Time zone: UTC-6 (Central (CST))
  - Summer (DST): UTC-5 (CDT)
- ZIP code: 55992
- Area code: 507
- GNIS feature ID: 654739

Hader is an unincorporated community in Goodhue County, Minnesota, United States.

The community is located at the junction of U.S. Highway 52, State Highway 57 (MN 57), and Goodhue County Road 8 (County 8 Boulevard).

Hader is located within Leon Township and Wanamingo Township. Nearby places include Zumbrota, Wanamingo, Goodhue, Minneola Township, Belle Creek Township, and Cannon Falls.

ZIP codes 55992 (Zumbrota), 55983 (Wanamingo), 55009 (Cannon Falls), and 55027 (Goodhue) all meet near Hader.

== History ==
When Hader was founded by Otis F. Smith in 1857, it was built in order to be the county seat. However, these plans failed, the plat was not fulfilled, and few buildings were built during that time.
