= Sogn, Minnesota =

Unincorporated community in Minnesota, United States

Sogn
- Unincorporated community
- Location within Minnesota Location within the United States
- Coordinates: 44°24′23″N 92°55′41″W
- Country: United States
- State: Minnesota
- County: Goodhue
- Township: Warsaw
- Elevation: 938 ft (286 m)
- Time zone: UTC-6 (Central (CST))
  - Summer (DST): UTC-5 (CDT)
- ZIP code: 55018
- Area code: 507
- GNIS feature ID: 652224

Sogn is an unincorporated community in Warsaw Township, Goodhue County, Minnesota, United States.

The community is located at the junction of Goodhue County Roads 9 and 14. The Little Cannon River flows through the community. U.S. 52 and State Highway 56 (MN 56) are both nearby.

Nearby places include Dennison, Wastedo, and Cannon Falls.

Sogn is the home of the Sogn Valley Orchard. The community is also home to the Sogn Valley Craft Fair, an annual event in October. County 24 Boulevard is also in the immediate area.
