= Minnesota State Highway 57 =

State highway in Minnesota, United States

Trunk Highway 57
- MN 57 highlighted in red

Route information
- Maintained by MnDOT
- Length: 24.578 mi (39.554 km)
- Existed: 1934–present

Major junctions
- South end: US 14 at Kasson
- MN 60 at Wanamingo
- North end: US 52 at Hader, in Wanamingo Township

Location
- Country: United States
- State: Minnesota
- Counties: Dodge, Goodhue

Highway system
- Minnesota Trunk Highway System; Interstate; US; State; Legislative; Scenic
| ← MN 56 | → MN 58 |

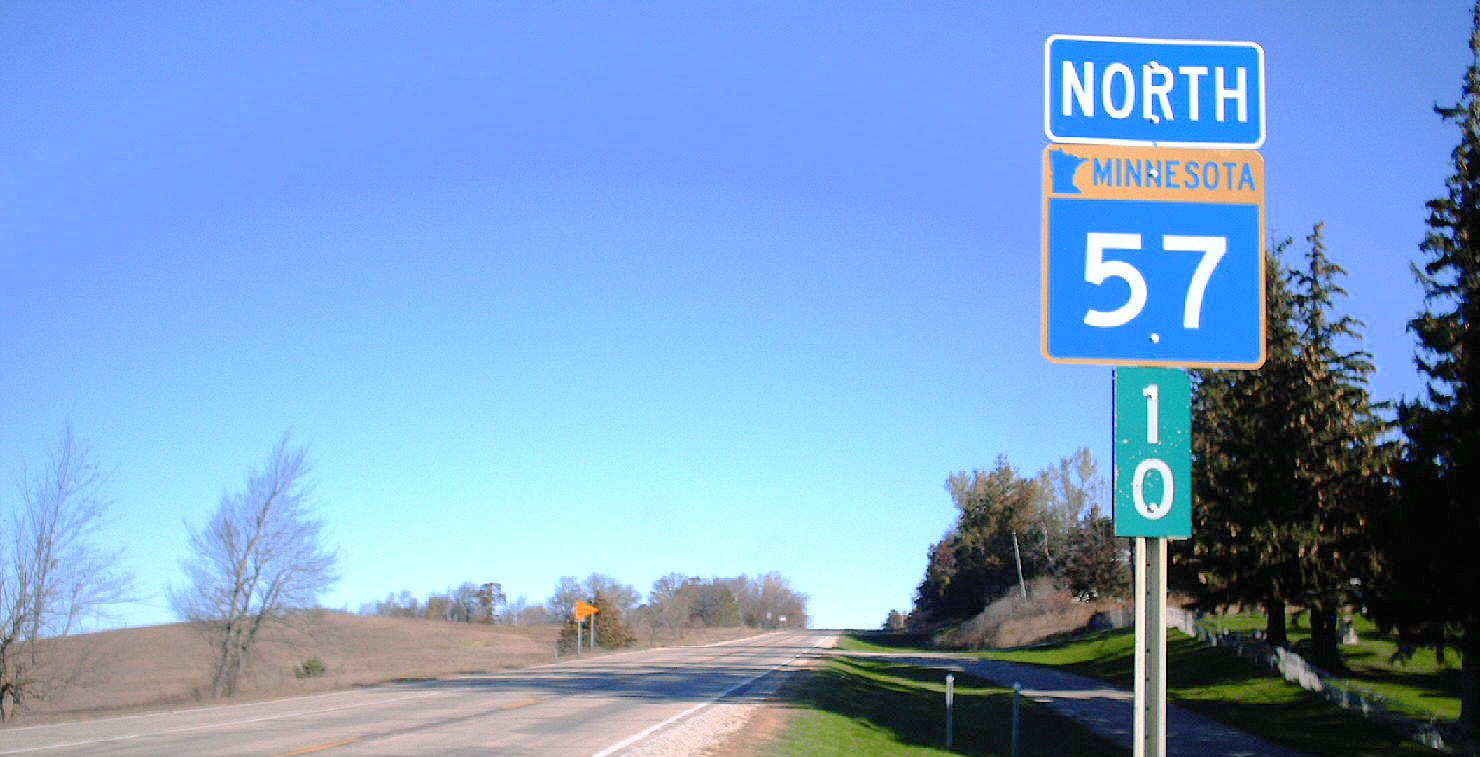
MN 57 at mile 10, just north of Berne

Minnesota State Highway 57 (MN 57) is a 24.578-mile-long (39.554 km) state highway in southeast Minnesota, which runs from its interchange with U.S. Highway 14 in the city of Kasson and continues north to its northern terminus at its intersection with U.S. Highway 52 in the unincorporated community of Hader in Wanamingo Township.

== Route description ==
Highway 57 serves as a north–south route in southeast Minnesota between Kasson, Mantorville, Wanamingo, and Hader.

Highway 57 is a two-lane undivided highway its entire length, except for a small portion in the city of Kasson. The route begins in Kasson, and heads through the center of town. Two miles north of Kasson, the route enters historic Mantorville and goes by some landmarks, such as the Hubbell House. North of Mantorville, Highway 57 is very lightly traveled and doesn't enter another incorporated city for twenty miles (32 km). The route intersects State Highway 60 at Wanamingo. Highway 57 then heads north four more miles to its northern terminus at its intersection with U.S. Highway 52 in Hader.

Highway 57 is also known as Mantorville Avenue in the city of Kasson. The route is also known as Main Street in the cities of Mantorville and Wanamingo.

== History ==
Highway 57 was first commissioned as Minnesota Constitutional Route 57 in 1920. Constitutional Route 57 only extended from Highway 14 in Kasson to Mantorville. The remainder of the route north to Hader was authorized in 1934. Highway 57 was completely paved by 1958. The route was extended south of the original terminus in Kasson in 1980 to meet the U.S. 14 bypass.

Highway 57 was the shortest constitutional route in the 1920 Minnesota highway plan, then only three miles in length between Kasson and Mantorville.

== Major intersections ==
| County | Location | mi | km | Destinations | Notes |
|---|---|---|---|---|---|
| Dodge | Kasson | 0.000– 0.127 | 0.000– 0.204 | US 14 - Rochester, Owatonna | Diamond interchange with intersections on MN 57 |
| Dodge | Kasson | 0.455 | 0.732 | CR 34 (Main Street) | Old US 14 |
| Dodge | Mantorville Township | 3.800 | 6.116 | CR 16 | |
| Dodge | Milton Township | 9.921 | 15.966 | CR 24 east – Pine Island | |
| Dodge | Milton Township | 10.067 | 16.201 | CR 24 west – West Concord | |
| Goodhue | Cherry Grove Township | 14.427 | 23.218 | CR 11 | |
| Goodhue | Wanamingo | 19.502 | 31.385 | MN 60 – Kenyon, Zumbrota | |
| Goodhue | Wanamingo Township | 24.395 | 39.260 | US 52 – Cannon Falls, Zumbrota | |
1.000 mi = 1.609 km; 1.000 km = 0.621 mi
