= Cannon Township =

Cannon Township may refer to the following townships of the United States:

- Cannon Township, Michigan
- Cannon Township, Minnesota

== See also ==
- Cannon Beach, Oregon, USA
- Cannon City, Minnesota, USA
- Cannon County, Tennessee, USA
- Cannon Falls, Minnesota, USA
- Cannon Falls Township, Minnesota, USA
