= Ryan, Minnesota =

Unincorporated community in Minnesota, United States

Ryan
- Unincorporated community
- Location within Minnesota Location within the United States
- Coordinates: 44°25′26″N 92°42′56″W
- Country: United States
- State: Minnesota
- County: Goodhue
- Township: Belle Creek
- Elevation: 1,158 ft (353 m)
- Time zone: UTC-6 (Central (CST))
  - Summer (DST): UTC-5 (CDT)
- ZIP code: 55027
- Area code: 651
- GNIS feature ID: 654921

Ryan is an unincorporated community in Belle Creek Township, Goodhue County, Minnesota, United States.

The center of Ryan is generally considered near the intersection of 362nd Street and 165th Avenue.

County 7 Boulevard and Wheat Trail are also in the immediate area. County 7 runs north–south. Nearby County Road 9 runs east–west.

Ryan is located within ZIP code 55027 based in Goodhue.

Nearby places include Goodhue, Cannon Falls, White Rock, Hader, Zumbrota, and Red Wing.

== History ==
Ryan was settled primarily by Irish. It had a stage coach stop on the route between Red Wing and Kenyon. The community also had a post office that operated from 1882 to 1903. In the present day, St. Columbkill's Church remains an attraction in the community.
