= White Rock, Minnesota =

Unincorporated community in Minnesota, United States

White Rock
- Unincorporated community
- Location within Minnesota Location within the United States
- Coordinates: 44°27′23″N 92°46′02″W
- Country: United States
- State: Minnesota
- County: Goodhue
- Townships: Belle Creek, Vasa
- Elevation: 971 ft (296 m)
- Time zone: UTC-6 (Central (CST))
  - Summer (DST): UTC-5 (CDT)
- ZIP code: 55009
- Area code: 651
- GNIS feature ID: 654090

White Rock is an unincorporated community in Goodhue County, Minnesota, United States.

White Rock is located within Belle Creek Township and Vasa Township. Belle Creek flows through the community.

Nearby places include Cannon Falls, Goodhue, Ryan, Hader, Vasa, Welch, and Red Wing. White Rock is located nine miles east-southeast of Cannon Falls. White Rock is located 11 miles northwest of Goodhue; and 15 miles southwest of Red Wing.
