= U.S. Route 52 in Minnesota =

Section of U.S. Highway in Minnesota, United States

U.S. Highway 52
- US 52 highlighted in red

Route information
- Maintained by MnDOT
- Length: 374.703 mi (603.026 km) 243 miles along I-94
- Existed: 1934–present

Major junctions
- South end: US 52 at Prosper
- I-90 near Rochester; US 14 / US 63 at Rochester; I-494 / MN 62 in Inver Grove Heights; I-94 / US 10 / MN 5 in St. Paul
- North end: I-94 / US 52 at Moorhead

Location
- Country: United States
- State: Minnesota
- Counties: Fillmore, Olmsted, Goodhue, Dakota, Ramsey, Hennepin, Wright, Stearns, Todd, Douglas, Grant, Otter Tail, Wilkin, Clay

Highway system
- United States Numbered Highway System; List; Special; Divided; Minnesota Trunk Highway System; Interstate; US; State; Legislative; Scenic
| ← MN 51 | → US 53 |

U.S. Highway 52 (US 52) enters the state of Minnesota at the unincorporated community of Prosper, north of the town of Burr Oak, Iowa. The route is marked north–south in Minnesota along its independent segment from the Iowa state line to downtown St. Paul. US 52 is not signed along the length of its concurrency with Interstate 94 (I-94) from downtown St. Paul to the North Dakota state line at Moorhead and Fargo.

== Route description ==
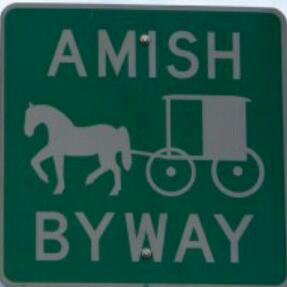
US 52 is designated as the Amish Buggy Byway from MN 44 near Prosper to MN 16 near Preston.

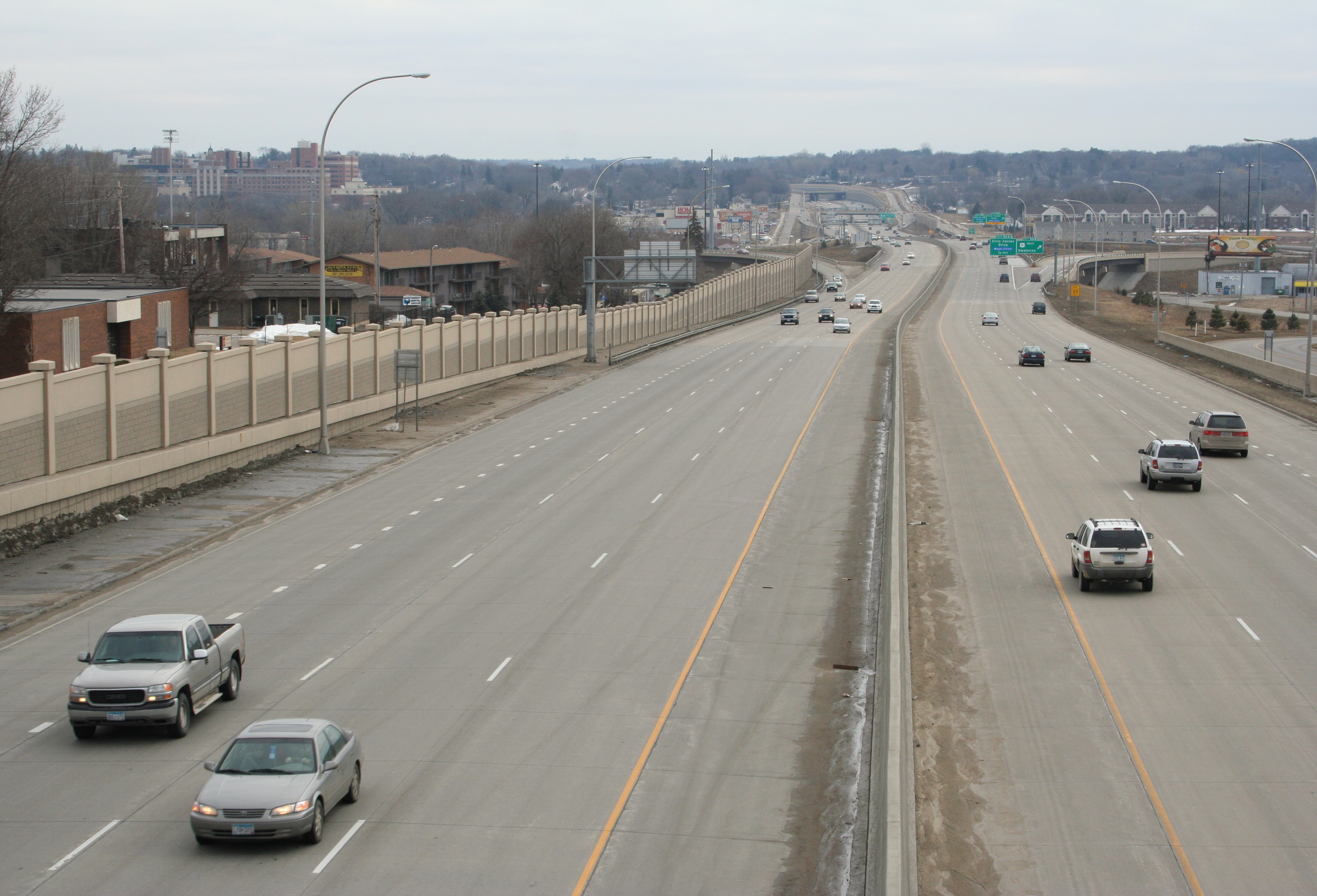
US 52 in Rochester

US 52 enters Fillmore County and heads through the same Driftless Area it ran through in Iowa. The route heads through Preston and proceeds north to Chatfield. US 52 leaves the river bluffs near Chatfield and enters terrain typical of southern Minnesota. This area is mostly farmland for the rest of the length until the route enters the city of Rochester. US 52 has a folded diamond interchange with I-90 south of Rochester, and expands to a four-lane freeway north of this junction. The roadway expands further to six lanes around Rochester, from the junction with US 63 to County Road 14 (CR 14), which is at the northern tip city. US 14 is a major route, and connects Owatonna to Rochester. North of Rochester, US 52 becomes a mixture of freeway and expressway through the farmland of Olmsted and Goodhue counties. Zumbrota is bypassed by the highway, and the route heads to Dakota County. The highway then passes through Cannon Falls. North of Cannon Falls, the highway is crossed by a railroad track at the surface. As the highway continues north, it bypasses Hampton and Coates.

North of Coates, US 52 enters the edge of the Twin Cities area. The route enters Inver Grove Heights where it becomes the Lafayette Freeway north of Concord Boulevard. Until 2009, this part of the highway was also crossed by a railroad track at the surface. US 52 splits with State Highway 55 (MN 55) north of there. MN 55 heads to Minneapolis, while US 52 heads to St. Paul. I-494 intersects US 52 in the northern part of Inver Grove Heights. The St. Paul Downtown Airport is right off of US 52 in St. Paul. After US 52 crosses the Mississippi River in downtown St. Paul, is intersects I-94 and follows I-94 through Minneapolis to I-694 in Brooklyn Center. It then follows 94/694 to the junction with I-494 in Maple Grove, then stays with I-94 to the North Dakota state line; US 52 is not signed along the length of this concurrency.

=== Transit ===
Intercity bus services are operated along a majority of the US 52 corridor from Rochester to the North Dakota state line by Jefferson Lines.

== History ==
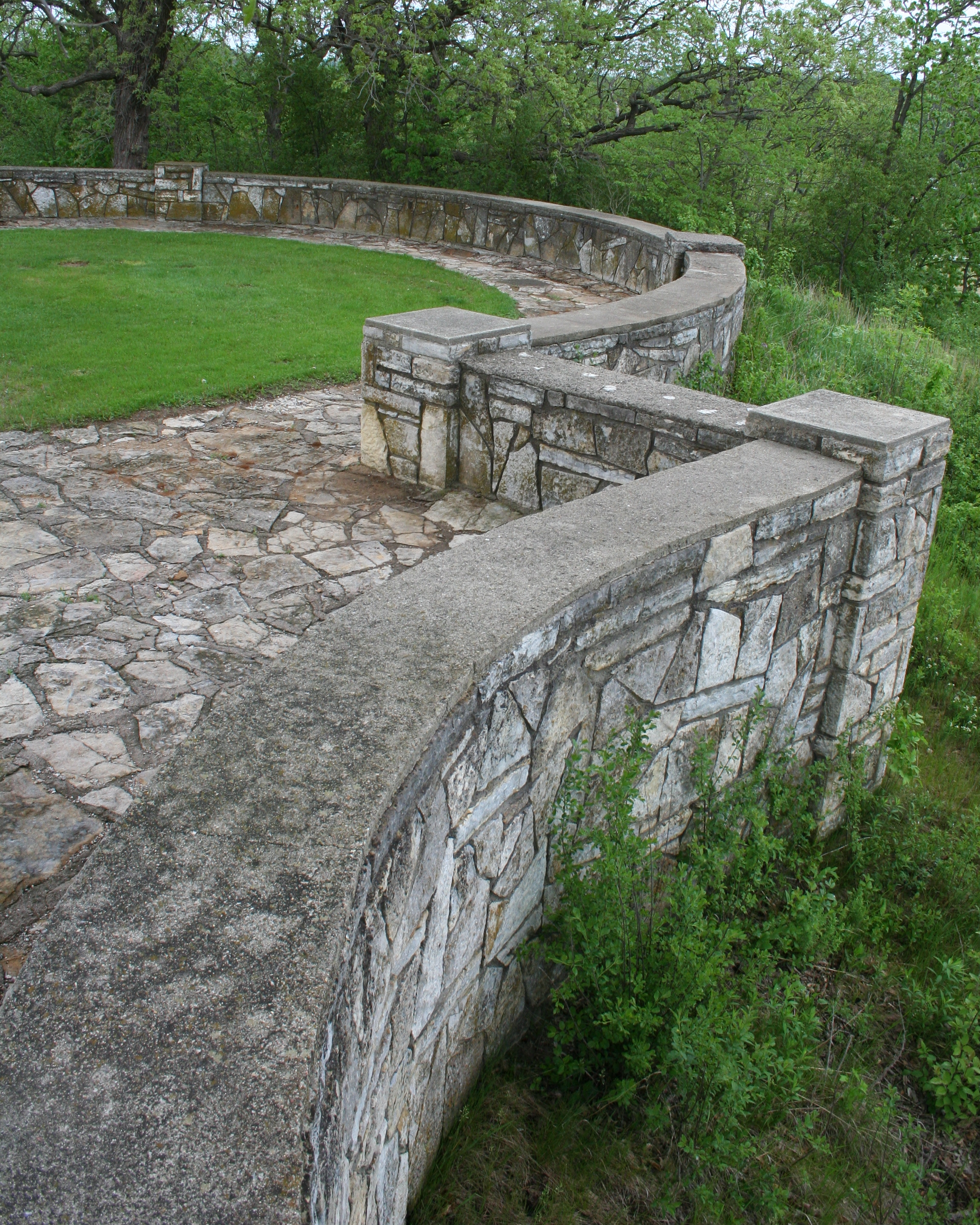
Preston Overlook, listed on the National Register of Historic Places, on US 52 in Fillmore County

US 52 was extended into the state of Minnesota in 1934. The road replaced the former routing of old US 55 from the Iowa state line to the Twin Cities, and the former route of old US 10S from Minneapolis west to North Dakota. I-94 replaced most of the routing of US 52 west of St. Cloud, and the routing from St. Cloud to Minneapolis was replaced by US 10, US 169, and CR 81. US 52 was routed along University Avenue through Minneapolis and St. Paul until about 1995 (In 1986, US 52 on University Avenue between I-35W and the St. Paul border was turned over to Hennepin County maintenance and renumbered CR 36/CR 37, creating a gap in US 52 until the 1995 route change). West of here, it turned west onto Washington Avenue that traversed directly through the University of Minnesota and Downtown Minneapolis. Progressing further, it took another left turn at Broadway Street before eventually curving to the northwest towards Robbinsdale, Crystal, Brooklyn Park and Osseo. Afterwards, it turned right onto what is now US 169 through Champlin and Anoka thus eventually merging onto US 10 towards Elk River and St. Cloud. It eventually turned onto city streets through St. Cloud and back onto the present-day I-94 alignment.

US 52 was routed along Robert Street through St. Paul, West St. Paul, and into Inver Grove Heights until 1995; when US 52 was moved onto the nearby Lafayette Freeway. The Lafayette Bridge which takes the highway across the Mississippi River near downtown St. Paul was originally built in 1968 and was a "fracture critical" structure which was in need of replacement. Construction of the new bridge, which carries six lanes of US 52, was completed in fall of 2015.

US 52 was built as an expressway from Rochester to St. Paul in the 1960s. The "ROC52" project expanded the section of US 52 in Rochester to a six-lane freeway in 2005–2006. Between Rochester and the Twin Cities, many at-grade intersections have been converted to interchanges since the 1990s. However, many at-grade intersections remain along this segment of highway.

In November 2013, a diverging diamond interchange (DDI), the Elk Run interchange, was completed in New Haven Township, Olmsted County, between Oronoco and Pine Island, at a relocated CR 12; in addition, CR 31 was relocated, direct accesses to US 52 from 120th and 520th streets were closed, a frontage road system was created and roundabouts were constructed on surrounding roads; the project cost was $34.3 million.

An experimental installation of Cooperative Intersection Collision Avoidance Systems–Stop Sign Assist (CICAS–SSA) was installed at the at-grade intersection with CR 9 near Cannon Falls, making use of dynamic message signs to show when it is safe to cross or turn onto the highway. A full-scale field test began in January 2010, though a previous version had also been tried at the intersection a few years earlier. This intersection was later converted to a full grade-separated interchange, with the work completed in late 2014.

In 2009 the railroad that crosses the highway north of Cannon Falls was reactivated after being out of service for five years.

Prior to October 2014, US 52 had an incomplete junction with North Main Street on the north side of Pine Island, straddling the Pine Island Township line. Southbound there is an exit to Main. Continuing south, there was an intersection with Main that crossed the southbound lanes of US 52 at-grade before crossing the median, then merging onto the left-hand side of US 52's northbound lanes; at the same intersection there was a right-turn lane to southbound US 52; there was no access from northbound US 52 to Main. Over the previous ten years, there had been 26 crashes at this junction, including one fatality. By September 2014, the Minnesota Department of Transportation (MnDOT) had decided to close most of this access, however, a permanent closure was not possible, as access to US 52 still has to be available during emergencies, such as a 2010 flood; in fact, Pine Island's exit to the south at CR 11 often floods in the winter. Instead, it was decided that a moveable gate would be placed on Main blocking access to the at-grade intersection; the southbound exit ramp would be retained. On October 29, a gate was put in place, with road striping and signage placed accordingly. During the week of May 4, 2015, the roadway through the median began to be removed. Pine Island and Goodhue County officials decried the design of the closure as "awkward", noting that during heavy snows, vehicles could go around the gate and still access US 52. The officials called for an interchange or some other solution to restore access to US 52 from the north side of Pine Island, but no funding or junction design had been identified as of 2015.

In October 2014, an interchange was completed in Cannon Falls which eliminated the last two traffic lights between St. Paul and Rochester on US 52.

== Future ==
Currently, the junction of US 52 and I-90 is a folded diamond interchange; as such, it is not free-flowing; four of the movements require left turns across traffic, with southbound US 52 to eastbound I-90 responsible for a 2022 daily average of 92%, or 6789, of left turns at the interchange. In the five years preceding 2022, there were 27 crashes, many T-bone, involving vehicles making the southbound US 52 to eastbound I-90 movement; in the same period, there were 25 crashes involving vehicles making the westbound I-90 to northbound US 52 movement, many of the run-off-the-road variety. MnDOT plans to add a flyover ramp to handle the southbound US 52 to eastbound I-90 movement, otherwise retain the folded diamond configuration, but with replaced and realigned ramps, and replace the I-90 bridges over US 52; these changes are to improve safety and traffic flow at the interchange. The project was scheduled to be constructed from 2024 to 2026, at an estimated cost of $25 million. The project started on July 15, 2024, and the flyover ramp opened two years later on July 15, 2026. The bridges opened in 2025 and 2026. The eastbound bridge opened on November 14, 2025, and the westbound bridge opened on October 8, 2026.

== Major intersections ==
| County | Location | mi | km | Exit | Destinations | Notes |
|---|---|---|---|---|---|---|
| Fillmore | Prosper | 0.000 | 0.000 | | US 52 south – Decorah | Continuation into Iowa |
| Fillmore | Prosper | 1.005 | 1.617 | | MN 44 – Mabel | |
| Fillmore | Harmony | 9.256 | 14.896 | | MN 139 – Cresco IA | Formerly MN 44 west |
| Fillmore | Preston | 17.070 | 27.472 | | MN 16 east (Historic Bluff Country Scenic Byway) – Lanesboro, Rushford | Southern end of MN 16 concurrency |
| Fillmore | Preston | 20.728 | 33.358 | | MN 16 west (Historic Bluff Country Scenic Byway / Laura Ingalls Wilder Historic Highway) – Spring Valley | Northern end of MN 16 concurrency |
| Fillmore | Fountain | 24.902 | 40.076 | | MN 80 west – Wykoff | |
| Fillmore | Chatfield | 34.357 | 55.292 | | MN 30 east / MN 74 north / CSAH 2 – St. Charles, Rushford | Southern end of MN 30 concurrency |
| Olmsted | Chatfield | 34.856 | 56.095 | | MN 30 west – Stewartville | Northern end of MN 30 concurrency |
| Olmsted | Marion Township | 46.491 | 74.820 | 46 | I-90 – La Crosse, Austin | Southern end of freeway section; folded diamond interchange; I-90 exit 217; exits for I-90 are exit 46 based on US-52's mileage. |
| Olmsted | Marion Township | 47.668 | 76.714 | 47 | CSAH 36 (Marion Road) / CSAH 111 | |
| Olmsted | Marion Township | 51.009 | 82.091 | 50 | CSAH 1 (11th Avenue SE) | |
| Olmsted | Rochester | 52.180 | 83.976 | 51 | US 63 south (Broadway Avenue / Laura Ingalls Wilder Historic Highway) to I-90 west – Stewartville | Southern end of US 63 concurrency; access to Rochester International Airport |
| Olmsted | Rochester | 54.346 | 87.461 | 53 | 16th Street SW | |
| Olmsted | Rochester | 54.746 | 88.105 | 54A | US 14 east (12th Street SW) – Winona | Southern end of US 14 concurrency; southbound exit and northbound entrance |
| Olmsted | Rochester | 54.746 | 88.105 | 54B | CSAH 22 (Salem Road) | Southbound exit and northbound entrance |
| Olmsted | Rochester | 54.797 | 88.187 | 55A | 6th Street SW | Northbound exit and southbound entrance |
| Olmsted | Rochester | 55.399 | 89.156 | 55B | CSAH 34 west (2nd Street) / Hospital | |
| Olmsted | Rochester | 56.466 | 90.873 | 56 | US 14 west (Laura Ingalls Wilder Historic Highway) / Civic Center Drive – Owatonna, Mayo Clinic | Northern end of US 14 concurrency; partial cloverleaf; signed as exits 56A (Civic Center) and 56B (US 14) |
| Olmsted | Rochester | 57.345 | 92.288 | 56C | 19th Street NW / Elton Hills Drive | |
| Olmsted | Rochester | 58.699– 58.981 | 94.467– 94.921 | 58 | 37th Street NW / 41st Street NW | |
| Olmsted | Rochester | 60.048 | 96.638 | 59 | CSAH 22 west (West Circle Drive) / 55th Street NW | |
| Olmsted | Rochester | 61.057 | 98.262 | 60 | 65th Street NW | |
| Olmsted | Rochester | 62.059 | 99.874 | 61 | US 63 north / CSAH 44 (75th Street NW) | Northern end of US 63 concurrency |
| Olmsted | Oronoco Township | 64.629 | 104.010 | 64 | CSAH 12 west / CR 112 – Oronoco | Southern end of CSAH 12 concurrency |
| Olmsted | New Haven Township | 66.618 | 107.211 | 68 | CSAH 12 east / CSAH 5 – Plainview | Northern end of CSAH 12 concurrency; northern end of freeway section |
| Goodhue | Pine Island | 71.624 | 115.268 | — | CSAH 11 – Pine Island | Interchange |
| Goodhue | Pine Island Township | 72.573 | 116.795 | — | Pine Island | Interchange; southbound exit only |
| Goodhue | Pine Island Township | 76.232 | 122.684 | — | MN 60 east – Mazeppa, Wabasha | Southern end of MN 60 concurrency; southern end of freeway section |
| Goodhue | Zumbrota | 77.621 | 124.919 | 77 | MN 58 / CSAH 10 – Zumbrota, Red Wing | Converted to roundabout interchange |
| Goodhue | Zumbrota | 78.669 | 126.605 | — | MN 60 west – Wanamingo, Kenyon, Zumbrota | Northern end of MN 60 concurrency; northern end of freeway section |
| Goodhue | Hader | 86.604 | 139.376 | 86 | MN 57 / CSAH 8 – Wanamingo, Mantorville | Former at-grade intersection; interchange; northbound ramps opened on November 4, 2022, southbound ramps opened on November 15, 2022 |
| Goodhue | Leon Township | 89.822 | 144.554 | 89 | CSAH 1 / CSAH 9 – Dennison, Goodhue | Interchange |
| Goodhue | Cannon Falls | 96.889 | 155.928 | 96 | CSAH 24 – Cannon Falls | Interchange |
| Goodhue | Cannon Falls | 98.445 | 158.432 | 98 | MN 19 – Cannon Falls, Northfield | Interchange |
| Dakota | Randolph Township | 101.180 | 162.833 | 100 | CSAH 86 – Cannon Falls | Interchange; opened in 2016 |
| Dakota | Hampton | 106.056 | 170.681 | 105 | MN 50 / MN 56 – Farmington, Red Wing, Kenyon, Randolph | MN 56 not signed northbound |
| Dakota | Hampton | 107.158 | 172.454 | 106 | CSAH 47 – Hampton | |
| Dakota | Coates | 113.982 | 183.436 | 113 | CSAH 46 | |
| Dakota | Rosemount | 115.950 | 186.603 | 115 | CSAH 42 – Rosemount | |
| Dakota | Rosemount | 117.753 | 189.505 | — | MN 55 east / Great River Road (National Route) – Hastings | Southern end of MN 55 concurrency; interchange southbound, access via connector road northbound; southern end of freeway section |
| Dakota | Rosemount | 118.669 | 190.979 | — | 117th Street | |
| Dakota | Inver Grove Heights | 121.338 | 195.275 | — | CSAH 56 north (Concord Boulevard) / Great River Road (National Route) | |
| Dakota | Inver Grove Heights | 122.007 | 196.351 | 121 | MN 55 west – Minneapolis | Northern end of MN 55 concurrency; northbound exit and southbound entrance |
| Dakota | Inver Grove Heights | 122.854 | 197.714 | 122 | MN 55 west / 80th Street East | Northbound signed as "80th Street East" only |
| Dakota | Inver Grove Heights | 123.843 | 199.306 | 123 | CSAH 26 (70th Street East) | |
| Dakota | Inver Grove Heights | 125.073 | 201.285 | 124 | Upper 55th Street East | |
| Dakota | Inver Grove Heights | 125.717 | 202.322 | 125 | I-494 / MN 62 | Signed as exits 125A (east) and 125B (west); I-494 exit 66 |
| Dakota | South St. Paul | 126.453 | 203.506 | 126 | Southview Boulevard / Mendota Road | |
| Dakota | South St. Paul–West St. Paul line | 127.384 | 205.005 | 127 | Wentworth Avenue / Thompson Avenue | |
| Dakota | South St. Paul–West St. Paul line | 128.386 | 206.617 | 128 | Butler Avenue | |
| Ramsey | Saint Paul | 129.493 | 208.399 | 129A | MN 156 (Concord Street) | |
| Ramsey | Saint Paul | 129.717 | 208.759 | 129B | Eaton Street | Southbound exit and northbound entrance |
| Ramsey | Saint Paul | 130.398 | 209.855 | 130 | Plato Boulevard / Fillmore Avenue | Access to St. Paul Downtown Airport; Fillmore Avenue not signed southbound |
| Ramsey | Saint Paul | 131.334 | 211.362 | 131A | MN 5 (7th Street) | Northbound exit and southbound entrance |
| Ramsey | Saint Paul | 131.352 | 211.391 | 131B | I-94 / US 10 east (US 12 east) | Southern end of I-94 concurrency; I-94 exit 242D |
Unmarked concurrency with I-94 to North Dakota state line
| Red River of the North | | 374.703 | 603.026 | | I-94 west / US 52 west — Fargo, Valley City | Continuation into North Dakota |
1.000 mi = 1.609 km; 1.000 km = 0.621 mi: Concurrency terminus; Incomplete access

U.S. Route 52
| Previous state: North Dakota | Minnesota | Next state: Iowa |
