= Zumbrota =

Zumbrota may refer to:

== Places ==
=== United States ===
- Zumbrota, Minnesota, a city
  - Zumbrota Covered Bridge, Minnesota's last remaining covered bridge
- Zumbrota Township, Goodhue County, Minnesota

== Ships ==
- USS Zumbrota (YP-93), a patrol craft that served in the United States Navy from 1917 to 1923
