= Roscoe, Goodhue County, Minnesota =

Unincorporated community in Minnesota, United States

Roscoe
- Unincorporated community
- Location within Minnesota Location within the United States
- Coordinates: 44°13′31″N 92°46′18″W
- Country: United States
- State: Minnesota
- County: Goodhue
- Township: Roscoe
- Elevation: 1,191 ft (363 m)
- Time zone: UTC-6 (Central (CST))
  - Summer (DST): UTC-5 (CDT)
- ZIP code: 55963
- Area code: 507
- GNIS feature ID: 654913

Roscoe is an unincorporated community in Roscoe Township, Goodhue County, Minnesota, United States.

The community is located at the junction of County 11 Boulevard and County 27 Boulevard.

State Highway 57 (MN 57), County 10 Boulevard, and County 12 Boulevard are also in the immediate area.

ZIP codes 55963 (Pine Island), 55983 (Wanamingo), and 55992 (Zumbrota) all meet near Roscoe.
