= Forest Mills, Minnesota =

Unincorporated community in Minnesota, United States

Forest Mills
- Unincorporated community
- Location within Minnesota Location within the United States
- Coordinates: 44°17′52″N 92°38′27″W
- Country: United States
- State: Minnesota
- County: Goodhue
- Township: Zumbrota
- Elevation: 1,010 ft (310 m)
- Time zone: UTC-6 (Central (CST))
  - Summer (DST): UTC-5 (CDT)
- ZIP code: 55992
- Area code: 507
- GNIS feature ID: 654707

Forest Mills is an unincorporated community in Zumbrota Township, Goodhue County, Minnesota, United States.

The community is located near the junction of County 48 Boulevard and County 10 Boulevard.

The North Fork of the Zumbro River flows through the community. Forest Mills is located within ZIP code 55992 based in Zumbrota.

Historical population
Census	Pop.	Note	%±
1880	124		—
U.S. Decennial Census
