= Fairpoint, Minnesota =

Ghost town in Minnesota

Fairpoint
- Ghost town
- Location within Minnesota Location within the United States
- Coordinates: 44°12′15″N 92°52′15″W
- Country: United States
- State: Minnesota
- County: Goodhue
- Elevation: 1,171 ft (357 m)
- Time zone: UTC-6 (Central (CST))
  - Summer (DST): UTC-5 (CDT)
- ZIP code: 55946
- Area code: 507

Fairpoint is a ghost town in Cherry Grove Township, Goodhue County, in the U.S. state of Minnesota.

== History ==
Fairpoint was platted as a small village in 1857. A post office was established at Fairpoint from 1857 to 1861, and was reestablished in 1865 and remained in operation until it was discontinued in 1902. The Fairpoint cemetery remains today.

Historical population
Census	Pop.	Note	%±
1880	60		—
U.S. Decennial Census
