= Victor H. Schulz =

American farmer and politician (1910–1987)

Victor H. Schulz (September 9, 1910 – July 13, 1987) was an American farmer and politician.

Schulz was born in Belle Creek Township, Goodhue County, Minnesota and went to the public schools. He went to the University of Minnesota Farm School. Schulz lived with his wife and family in Goodhue, Minnesota and was a farmer. Schulz served in the Minnesota House of Representatives from 1971 to 1978 and was a Democrat. He died from cancer at the Zumbrota Community Hospital in Zumbrota, Minnesota. The funeral and burial was in Zumbrota, Minnesota.
