= Wangs, Minnesota =

Unincorporated community in Minnesota, United States

Wangs
- Unincorporated community
- Location within Minnesota Location within the United States
- Coordinates: 44°24′24″N 92°58′47″W
- Country: United States
- State: Minnesota
- County: Goodhue
- Township: Warsaw
- Elevation: 1,129 ft (344 m)
- Time zone: UTC-6 (Central (CST))
  - Summer (DST): UTC-5 (CDT)
- ZIP code: 55018
- Area code: 507
- GNIS feature ID: 654994

Wangs is an unincorporated community in Warsaw Township, Goodhue County, Minnesota, United States, near Dennison.
