= Featherstone Township, Goodhue County, Minnesota =

Featherstone Township, Minnesota
- Township
- Location within the state of Minnesota Featherstone Township, Minnesota (the United States)
- Coordinates: 44°29′10″N 92°36′9″W
- Country: United States
- State: Minnesota
- County: Goodhue

Area
  - Total: 35.9 sq mi (92.9 km^{2})
  - Land: 35.9 sq mi (92.9 km^{2})
  - Water: 0 sq mi (0.0 km^{2})
- Elevation: 1,080 ft (330 m)

Population (2000)
  - Total: 785
  - Density: 22/sq mi (8.4/km^{2})
- Time zone: UTC-6 (Central (CST))
  - Summer (DST): UTC-5 (CDT)
- FIPS code: 27-20780
- GNIS feature ID: 0664153

Featherstone Township is a township in Goodhue County, Minnesota, United States. The population was 785 at the 2000 census.

== History ==
Featherstone Township was organized in 1858, and named for William Featherstone, an early settler.

== Notable person ==
Lyle Mehrkens (1937-2018), Minnesota state legislator and farmer, was born in Featherstone Township.

== Geography ==
According to the United States Census Bureau, the township has a total area of 35.9 square miles (93 km^{2}), all land.

== Demographics ==
As of the census of 2000, there were 785 people, 274 households, and 241 families residing in the township. The population density was 21.9 inhabitants per square mile (8.5/km^{2}). There were 282 housing units at an average density of 7.9 per square mile (3.1/km^{2}). The racial makeup of the township was 98.73% White, 0.25% Native American, 0.25% Asian, 0.38% from other races, and 0.38% from two or more races. Hispanic or Latino of any race were 0.76% of the population.

There were 274 households, out of which 36.5% had children under the age of 18 living with them, 82.1% were married couples living together, 1.8% had a female householder with no husband present, and 12.0% were non-families. 9.5% of all households were made up of individuals, and 3.6% had someone living alone who was 65 years of age or older. The average household size was 2.86 and the average family size was 3.06.

In the township the population was spread out, with 24.8% under the age of 18, 7.9% from 18 to 24, 25.5% from 25 to 44, 29.3% from 45 to 64, and 12.5% who were 65 years of age or older. The median age was 41 years. For every 100 females, there were 106.6 males. For every 100 females age 18 and over, there were 100.7 males.

The median income for a household in the township was $56,136, and the median income for a family was $60,417. Males had a median income of $37,125 versus $24,792 for females. The per capita income for the township was $24,489. About 0.8% of families and 1.8% of the population were below the poverty line, including 2.1% of those under age 18 and 3.1% of those age 65 or over.
