= Florence, Goodhue County, Minnesota =

Ghost town in Minnesota

Florence
- Ghost town
- Location within Minnesota Location within the United States
- Coordinates: 44°29′31″N 92°18′56″W
- Country: United States
- State: Minnesota
- County: Goodhue
- Time zone: UTC-6 (Central (CST))
  - Summer (DST): UTC-5 (CDT)
- ZIP code: 55041
- Area code: 651

Florence is a ghost town in Florence Township, Goodhue County, in the U.S. state of Minnesota.

== History ==
A post office was established at Florence in 1858, and remained in operation until it was discontinued in 1867.

Historical population
Census	Pop.	Note	%±
1880	64		—
U.S. Decennial Census
