= Skyberg, Minnesota =

Unincorporated community in Minnesota, United States

Skyberg
- Unincorporated community
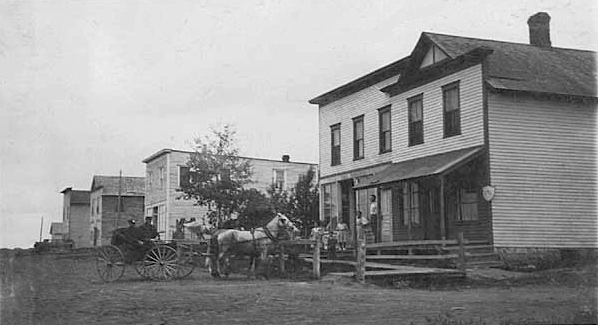
- Main Street, circa 1910

- Location within Minnesota Location within the United States
- Coordinates: 44°12′41″N 92°55′56″W
- Country: United States
- State: Minnesota
- County: Goodhue
- Township: Kenyon
- Elevation: 1,204 ft (367 m)
- Time zone: UTC-6 (Central (CST))
  - Summer (DST): UTC-5 (CDT)
- ZIP code: 55946
- Area code: 507
- GNIS feature ID: 654946

Skyberg is an unincorporated community in Kenyon Township, Goodhue County, Minnesota, United States.

The community is located southeast of Kenyon at the junction of State Highway 56 (MN 56) and County 11 Boulevard.

Skyberg is located five miles southeast of Kenyon, and four miles north of West Concord.
