= Cannon Falls Township, Goodhue County, Minnesota =

Cannon Falls Township, Minnesota
- Township
- Location within the state of Minnesota Cannon Falls Township, Minnesota (the United States)
- Coordinates: 44°29′55″N 92°52′16″W
- Country: United States
- State: Minnesota
- County: Goodhue

Area
  - Total: 33.9 sq mi (87.8 km^{2})
  - Land: 33.9 sq mi (87.8 km^{2})
  - Water: 0 sq mi (0.0 km^{2})
- Elevation: 965 ft (294 m)

Population (2000)
  - Total: 4k
  - Density: 37/sq mi (14.1/km^{2})
- Time zone: UTC-6 (Central (CST))
  - Summer (DST): UTC-5 (CDT)
- ZIP code: 55009
- Area code: 507
- FIPS code: 27-09748
- GNIS feature ID: 0663744
- Website: https://www.cannonfallstownshipmn.gov/

Cannon Falls Township is a township in Goodhue County, Minnesota, United States. The population was 1,236 at the 2000 census.

Cannon Falls Township was organized in 1858, and named for the falls on the Cannon River.

== Geography ==
Cannon Falls Township, named for the Big Cannon river and its branch, the Little Cannon, has a falls in its western region. The city of Cannon Falls is situated at this locale. The Big Cannon river traverses the northern territory of the township from west to east, presenting a varied topography in its valley. The river's outer bluffs stand distantly apart and rise significantly above the water level, encompassing broad terraces, farms, and timber regions. Certain areas feature sandy soil but the land supports agriculture, with dairying emerging as a key industry. The river bottom, varying in width, is characterized by gravelly soil.

According to the United States Census Bureau, the township has a total area of 33.9 square miles (88 km^{2}), all land.

== Demographics ==
As of the census of 2000, there were 1,236 people, 417 households, and 354 families residing in the township. The population density was 36.5 inhabitants per square mile (14.1/km^{2}). There were 427 housing units at an average density of 12.6 per square mile (4.9/km^{2}). The racial makeup of the township was 99.43% White, 0.16% African American, 0.16% Native American and 0.24% Asian. Hispanic or Latino of any race were 0.73% of the population.

There were 417 households, out of which 40.0% had children under the age of 18 living with them, 76.5% were married couples living together, 4.6% had a female householder with no husband present, and 14.9% were non-families. 10.6% of all households were made up of individuals, and 2.9% had someone living alone who was 65 years of age or older. The average household size was 2.96 and the average family size was 3.19.

In the township the population was spread out, with 29.3% under the age of 18, 7.2% from 18 to 24, 26.4% from 25 to 44, 28.6% from 45 to 64, and 8.5% who were 65 years of age or older. The median age was 38 years. For every 100 females, there were 108.1 males. For every 100 females age 18 and over, there were 106.1 males.

The median income for a household in the township was $66,250, and the median income for a family was $69,375. Males had a median income of $48,472 versus $30,595 for females. The per capita income for the township was $29,568. About 0.8% of families and 1.5% of the population were below the poverty line, including none of those under age 18 and 5.6% of those age 65 or over.
