= Pine Island Township, Goodhue County, Minnesota =

Pine Island Township, Minnesota
- Township
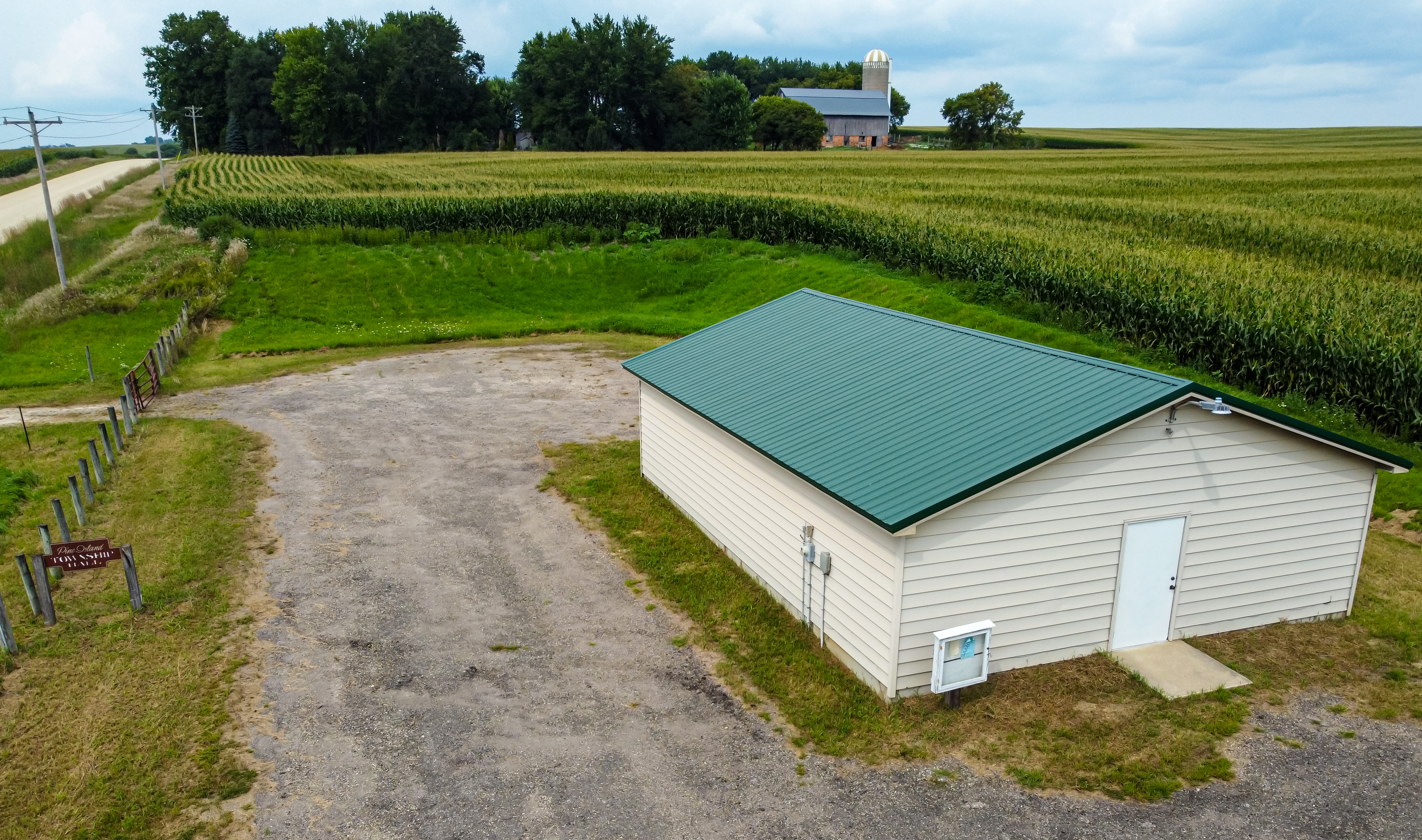
- Town hall

- Location within the state of Minnesota Pine Island Township, Minnesota (the United States)
- Coordinates: 44°13′49″N 92°37′33″W
- Country: United States
- State: Minnesota
- County: Goodhue

Area
  - Total: 32.7 sq mi (84.8 km^{2})
  - Land: 32.7 sq mi (84.8 km^{2})
  - Water: 0 sq mi (0.0 km^{2})
- Elevation: 1,089 ft (332 m)

Population (2000)
  - Total: 628
  - Density: 19/sq mi (7.4/km^{2})
- Time zone: UTC-6 (Central (CST))
  - Summer (DST): UTC-5 (CDT)
- ZIP code: 55963
- Area code: 507
- FIPS code: 27-51154
- GNIS feature ID: 0665304

Pine Island Township is a township located in Goodhue County, Minnesota, United States. As of the 2000 census, the township had a total population of 628.

Pine Island Township was organized in 1858.

== Geography ==
According to the United States Census Bureau, the township has a total area of 32.7 square miles (84.8 km^{2}), of which 32.7 square miles (84.8 km^{2}) is land and 0.03% is water.

== Demographics ==
As of the census of 2000, there were 628 people, 215 households, and 176 families residing in the township. The population density was 19.2 people per square mile (7.4/km^{2}). There were 221 housing units at an average density of 6.8/sq mi (2.6/km^{2}). The racial makeup of the township was 98.89% White, 0.32% African American, 0.48% Native American, 0.16% Asian, and 0.16% from other races. Hispanic or Latino of any race were 0.48% of the population.

There were 215 households, out of which 35.3% had children under the age of 18 living with them, 73.5% were married couples living together, 2.8% had a female householder with no husband present, and 18.1% were non-families. 14.9% of all households were made up of individuals, and 6.5% had someone living alone who was 65 years of age or older. The average household size was 2.92 and the average family size was 3.24.

In the township the population was spread out, with 28.2% under the age of 18, 8.0% from 18 to 24, 25.6% from 25 to 44, 29.1% from 45 to 64, and 9.1% who were 65 years of age or older. The median age was 38 years. For every 100 females, there were 125.1 males. For every 100 females age 18 and over, there were 113.7 males.

The median income for a household in the township was $59,063, and the median income for a family was $61,964. Males had a median income of $32,120 versus $24,375 for females. The per capita income for the township was $22,193. About 1.1% of families and 3.2% of the population were below the poverty line, including 3.7% of those under the age of 18 and 6.8% of those 65 and older.
