= Goodhue Township, Goodhue County, Minnesota =

Goodhue Township, Minnesota
- Township
- Location within the state of Minnesota Goodhue Township, Minnesota (the United States)
- Coordinates: 44°25′10″N 92°36′40″W
- Country: United States
- State: Minnesota
- County: Goodhue

Area
  - Total: 35.0 sq mi (90.6 km^{2})
  - Land: 35.0 sq mi (90.6 km^{2})
  - Water: 0 sq mi (0.0 km^{2})
- Elevation: 1,142 ft (348 m)

Population (2000)
  - Total: 530
  - Density: 15/sq mi (5.8/km^{2})
- Time zone: UTC-6 (Central (CST))
  - Summer (DST): UTC-5 (CDT)
- ZIP code: 55027
- Area code: 651
- FIPS code: 27-24416
- GNIS feature ID: 0664292

Goodhue Township (/ˈɡʊdhjuː/ GUUD-hew) is a township in Goodhue County, Minnesota, United States. The population was 530 at the 2000 census.

== History ==
Goodhue Township was organized in 1859.

== Geography ==
According to the United States Census Bureau, the township has a total area of 35.0 square miles (91 km^{2}), all land.

== Demographics ==
As of the census of 2000, there were 530 people, 173 households, and 142 families residing in the township. The population density was 15.2 inhabitants per square mile (5.9/km^{2}). There were 177 housing units at an average density of 5.1 per square mile (2.0/km^{2}). The racial makeup of the township was 98.11% White, 0.75% Asian, 0.94% from other races, and 0.19% from two or more races. Hispanic or Latino of any race were 1.13% of the population.

There were 173 households, out of which 39.9% had children under the age of 18 living with them, 75.1% were married couples living together, 2.3% had a female householder with no husband present, and 17.9% were non-families. 12.7% of all households were made up of individuals, and 4.6% had someone living alone who was 65 years of age or older. The average household size was 3.06 and the average family size was 3.37.

In the township the population was spread out, with 31.3% under the age of 18, 8.9% from 18 to 24, 28.3% from 25 to 44, 23.0% from 45 to 64, and 8.5% who were 65 years of age or older. The median age was 33 years. For every 100 females, there were 114.6 males. For every 100 females age 18 and over, there were 114.1 males.

The median income for a household in the township was $49,500, and the median income for a family was $50,625. Males had a median income of $31,172 versus $20,962 for females. The per capita income for the township was $19,786. About 2.9% of families and 2.7% of the population were below the poverty line, including 3.1% of those under age 18 and 8.2% of those age 65 or over.
