= Kenyon Township, Goodhue County, Minnesota =

Kenyon Township, Minnesota
- Township
- Location within the state of Minnesota Kenyon Township, Minnesota (the United States)
- Coordinates: 44°14′38″N 92°58′15″W
- Country: United States
- State: Minnesota
- County: Goodhue

Area
  - Total: 33.7 sq mi (87.4 km^{2})
  - Land: 33.7 sq mi (87.4 km^{2})
  - Water: 0 sq mi (0.0 km^{2})
- Elevation: 1,230 ft (375 m)

Population (2000)
  - Total: 437
  - Density: 13/sq mi (5/km^{2})
- Time zone: UTC-6 (Central (CST))
  - Summer (DST): UTC-5 (CDT)
- ZIP code: 55946
- Area code: 507
- FIPS code: 27-32858
- GNIS feature ID: 0664617

Kenyon Township is a township in Goodhue County, Minnesota. The population was 437 at the time of the 2000 census. The township was organized in 1858 and named for an early storekeeper.

== Geography ==
According to the United States Census Bureau, the township has a total area of 33.7 square miles (87 km^{2}), all land.

== Demographics ==
As of the census of 2000, there were 437 people, 160 households, and 132 families residing in the township. The population density was 13.0 inhabitants per square mile (5.0/km^{2}). There were 162 housing units at an average density of 4.8 per square mile (1.9/km^{2}). The racial makeup of the township was 96.80% White, 0.46% Native American, 0.46% Asian, 1.60% from other races, and 0.69% from two or more races. Hispanic or Latino of any race were 1.60% of the population.

There were 160 households, out of which 35.6% had children under the age of 18 living with them, 71.3% were married couples living together, 3.8% had a female householder with no husband present, and 17.5% were non-families. 15.6% of all households were made up of individuals, and 5.6% had someone living alone who was 65 years of age or older. The average household size was 2.73 and the average family size was 3.01.

In the township the population was spread out, with 27.9% under the age of 18, 6.6% from 18 to 24, 29.5% from 25 to 44, 26.3% from 45 to 64, and 9.6% who were 65 years of age or older. The median age was 37 years. For every 100 females, there were 108.1 males. For every 100 females age 18 and over, there were 105.9 males.

The median income for a household in the township was $51,250, and the median income for a family was $53,409. Males had a median income of $36,042 versus $28,125 for females. The per capita income for the township was $23,620. About 3.1% of families and 3.0% of the population were below the poverty line, including 4.5% of those under age 18 and none of those age 65 or over.
