= Goodhue County, Minnesota =

County in Minnesota, United States

- County
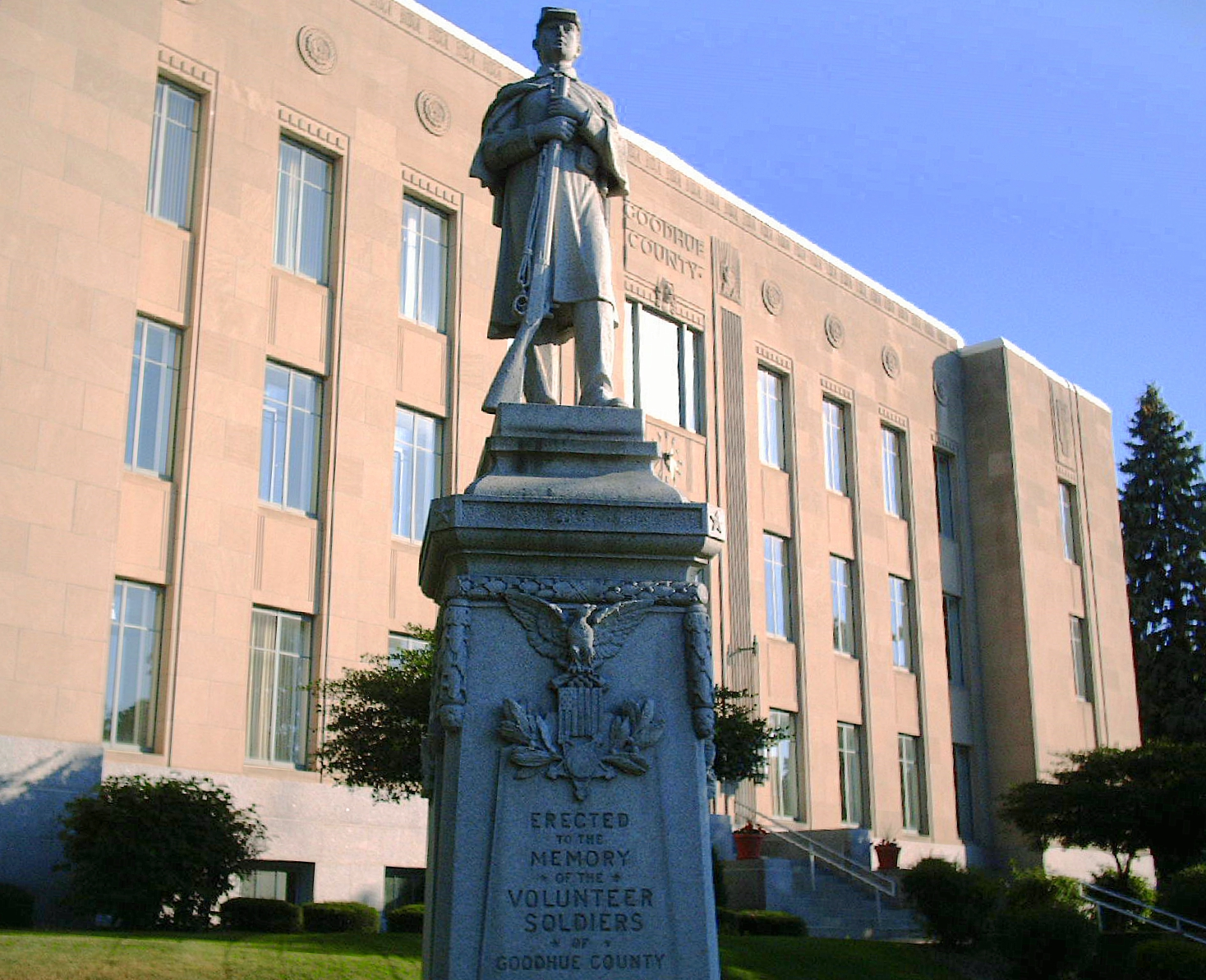
- Goodhue County Courthouse in Red Wing, Minnesota

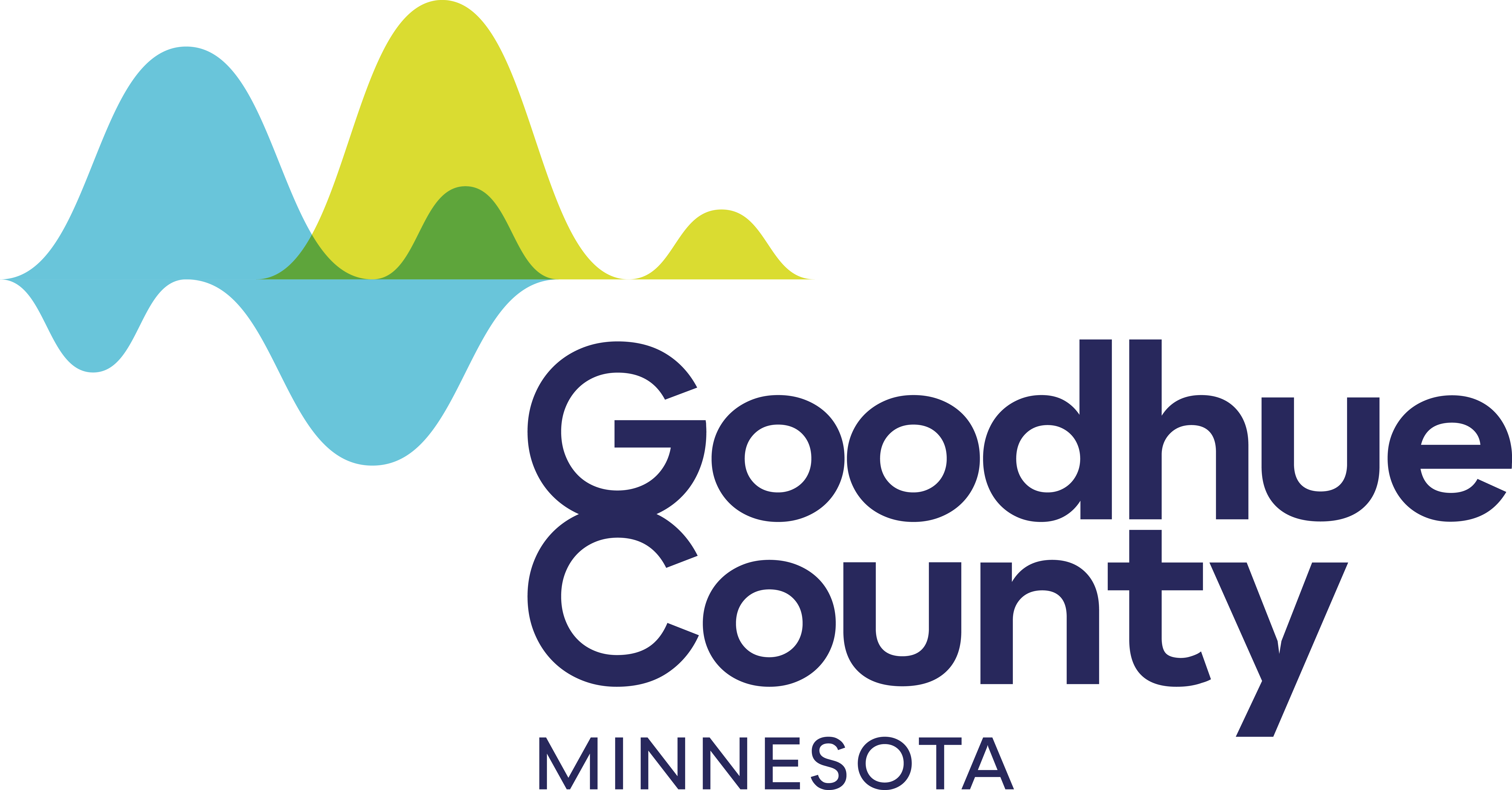
- Flag Seal Logo

- Location within the U.S. state of Minnesota
- Coordinates: 44°25′N 92°43′W
- Country: United States
- State: Minnesota
- Founded: March 5, 1853
- Named for: James M. Goodhue
- Seat: Red Wing
- Largest city: Red Wing

Area
  - Total: 780 sq mi (2,000 km^{2})
  - Land: 757 sq mi (1,960 km^{2})
  - Water: 24 sq mi (62 km^{2}) 3.0%

Population (2020)
  - Total: 47,582
  - Estimate (2025): 48,195 ▲
  - Density: 62.9/sq mi (24.3/km^{2})
- Time zone: UTC−6 (Central)
  - Summer (DST): UTC−5 (CDT)
- Congressional district: 1st
- Website: goodhuecountymn.gov

Goodhue County (/ˈɡʊdhjuː/ GUUD-hew) is a county in the U.S. state of Minnesota. As of the 2020 census, the population was 47,582. Its county seat is Red Wing. Nearly all of Prairie Island Indian Community is within the county.

Goodhue County comprises the Red Wing, MN Micropolitan Statistical Area and is included in the Minneapolis-St. Paul, MN-WI Combined Statistical Area.

== History ==
The county was created on March 5, 1853, with territory partitioned from Wabasha County. It was named for James Madison Goodhue (1810–1852), who published the first newspaper in the territory, The Minnesota Pioneer.

The county was originally settled exclusively by "Yankee" settlers, meaning that they both came to Goodhue County either directly from the six New England states or from upstate New York, where they were born to parents who had moved to that region from the six New England states in the immediate aftermath of the American Revolution, and that they were descended from the English Puritans who emigrated to North America during the early 1600s. Because of the prevalence of New Englanders and New England transplants from upstate New York the county was said to have a "distinctly New England character". While this was true of many neighboring counties it was considered exceptionally true of Goodhue County. The New Englanders brought with them many of their New England values, including a love of education and fervent support of the abolitionist movement. When the New Englanders arrived, they laid out farms, established post routes, and built schools and government buildings out of locally available materials. The New Englanders and their descendants made up the great majority of Goodhue County's inhabitants until the late 19th and early 20th century, when immigrants from Germany and Norway began arriving in the Minnesota-Wisconsin border region in large numbers. There were small numbers of immigrants from Germany, Norway and Sweden during the first several decades of Goodhue County's history as well.

Hamline University, Minnesota's first college of higher learning, was started in Red Wing in 1854. It closed during the Civil War, and reopened in 1869 in Saint Paul.

The county was a leading producer of wheat during the mid-19th century, and for several years the county boasted the highest wheat production in the country. Fires at two of Red Wing's mills in the 1880s and developing railroad routes across Minnesota encouraged farmers from neighboring counties to begin sending their wheat to Minneapolis mills, reducing the county's importance in the wheat trade around the start of the 20th century.

The first municipal swimming pool in the state was built in Goodhue County.

In October 1960, President Dwight D. Eisenhower visited the county for a bridge dedication ceremony. The Hiawatha Bridge had been built to replace the Old High Bridge that spanned the Mississippi River since 1895. This visit drew 20,000 people. Eisenhower hoped his visit would help in the elections, swaying Minnesota voters to vote for Richard Nixon in the 1960 presidential election in the coming month. But John F. Kennedy carried the state on his way to being elected the next president.

Soils of Goodhue County

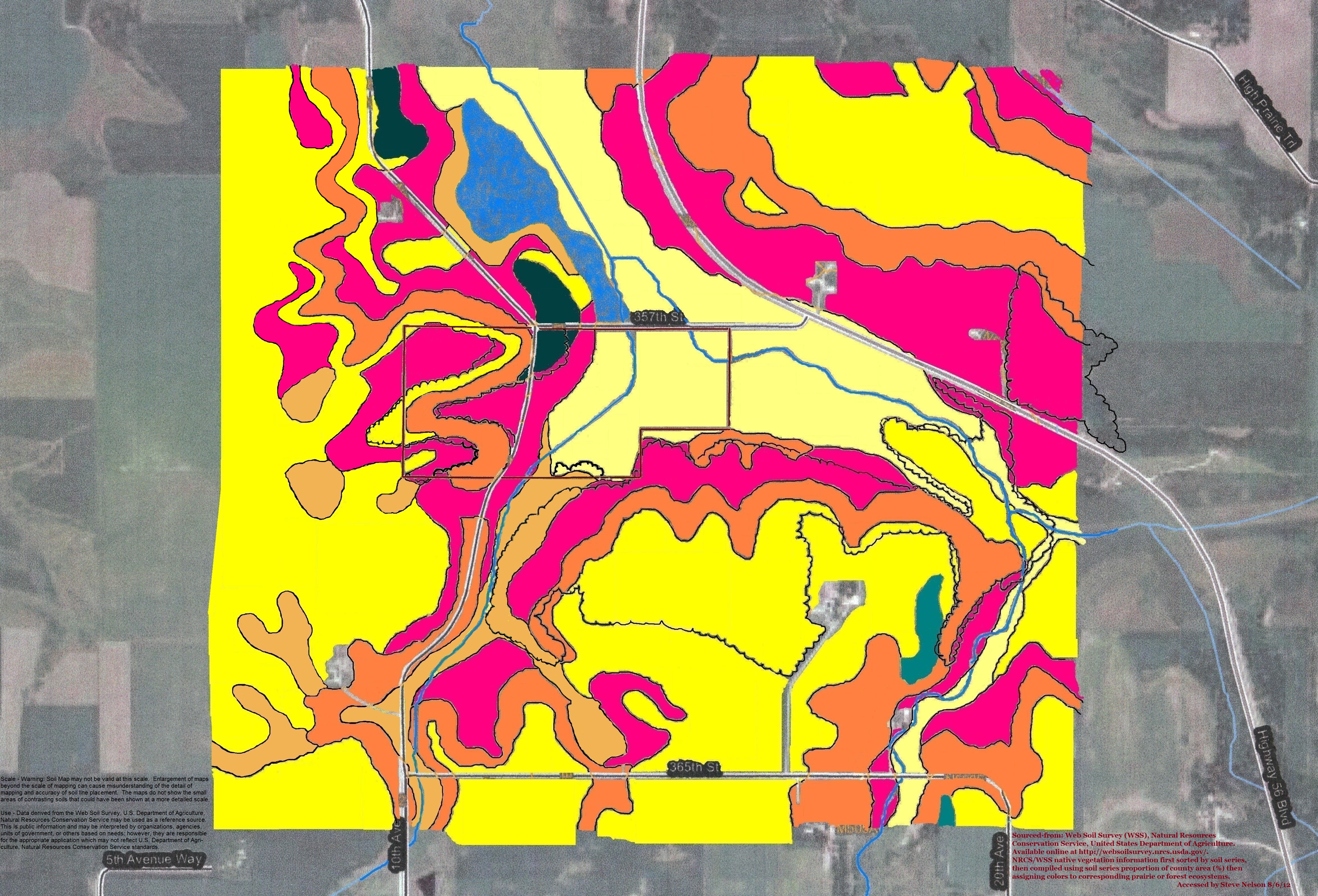
Soils of Warsaw WMA area

== Geography ==
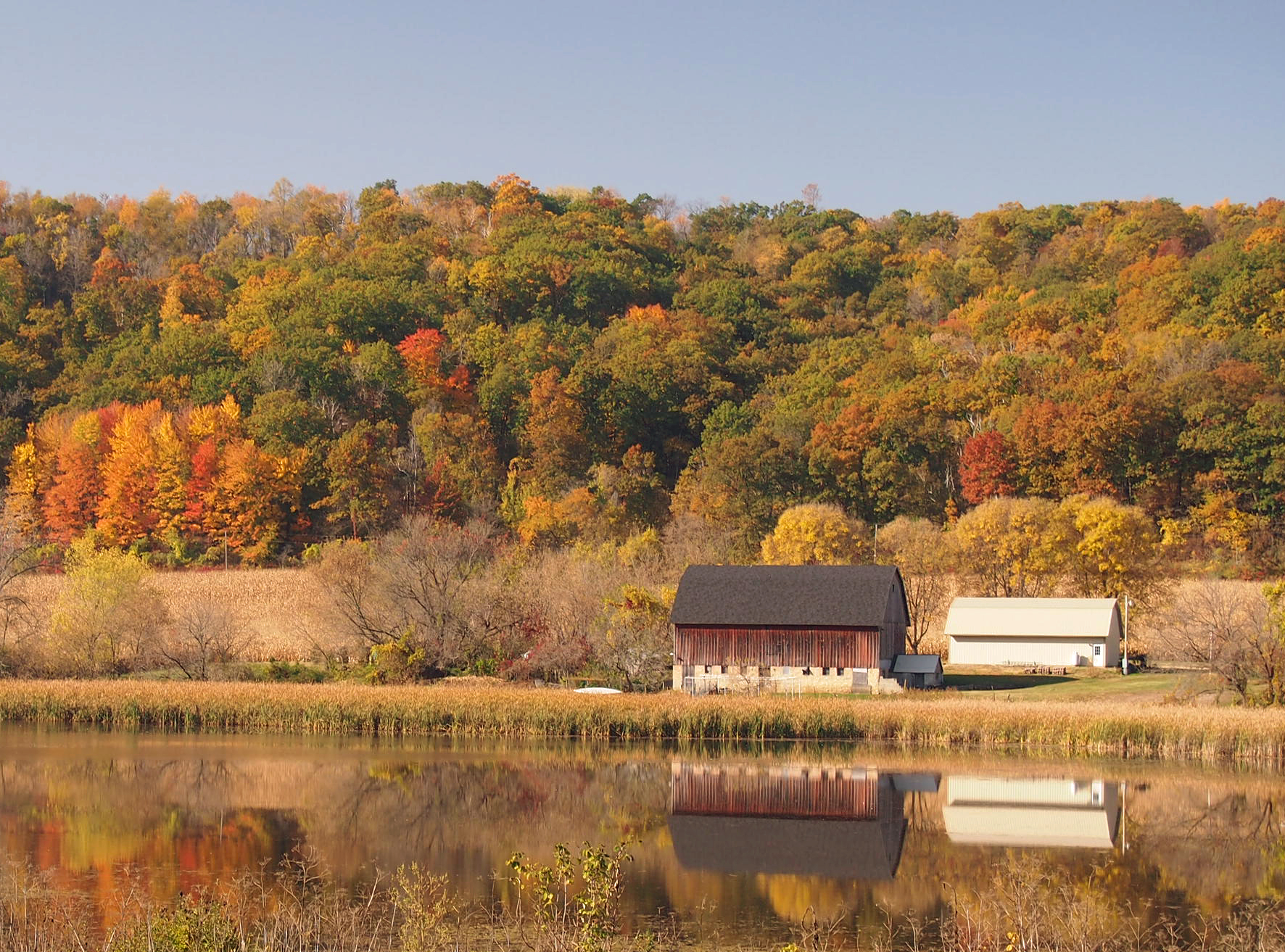
Rural Goodhue County from U.S. Route 61/63

Goodhue County lies on Minnesota's border with Wisconsin (across Lake Pepin). The Cannon River flows eastward through the northern part of the county on its way to discharge into Lake Pepin. The Little Cannon River flows northward through the west-central part of the county, discharging into the Cannon River at Cannon Falls. The North Fork of the Zumbro River flows eastward through the lower part of the county. The county terrain consists of rolling hills, etched with drainages and gullies, and with high bluffs against the river valleys. The terrain slopes to the east and north; its highest point is near its southwest corner at 1,260 ft (380 m) ASL. The county has an area of 780 square miles (2,000 km^{2}), of which 757 square miles (1,960 km^{2}) is land and 24 square miles (62 km^{2}) (3.0%) is water. Goodhue is one of 17 Minnesota counties with more savanna soils than either prairie or forest soils.

=== Lakes ===
- Birch Lake
- Brewer Lake
- Cannon Lake
- Clear Lake
- Devils Lake
- Espen Lakes
- Goose Lake
- Lake Byllesby
- Larson Lake
- Nelson Lake
- North Lake
- Rattling Springs Lake
- Spring Banks Lake
- Spring Creek Lake
- Sturgeon Lake
- Twin Lakes

=== Major highways ===
- U.S. Highway 52
- U.S. Highway 61
- U.S. Highway 63
- Minnesota State Highway 19
- Minnesota State Highway 20
- Minnesota State Highway 56
- Minnesota State Highway 57
- Minnesota State Highway 58
- Minnesota State Highway 60
- Minnesota State Highway 246
- Minnesota State Highway 292
- Minnesota State Highway 316
- List of county roads

=== Adjacent counties ===
- Pierce County, Wisconsin - north
- Pepin County, Wisconsin - northeast
- Wabasha County - east
- Olmsted County - southeast
- Dodge County - south
- Rice County - west
- Dakota County - northwest

=== Protected areas ===
- Cannon River Turtle Preserve Scientific and Natural Area
- Frontenac State Park
- Miesville Ravine Park Reserve (part)
- North Fork Zumbro Woods Scientific and Natural Area
- Spring Creek Prairie Scientific and Natural Area
- Woodbury State Wildlife Management Area

== Demographics ==
Historical population
Census	Pop.	Note	%±
1860	8,977		—
1870	22,018		145.3%
1880	29,651		34.7%
1890	28,806		−2.8%
1900	31,137		8.1%
1910	31,637		1.6%
1920	30,799		−2.6%
1930	31,317		1.7%
1940	31,564		0.8%
1950	32,118		1.8%
1960	33,035		2.9%
1970	34,804		5.4%
1980	38,749		11.3%
1990	40,690		5.0%
2000	44,127		8.4%
2010	46,183		4.7%
2020	47,582		3.0%
2025 (est.)	48,195	▲	1.3%
U.S. Decennial Census; 1790-1960 1900-1990; 1990-2000 2010-2020

=== Racial and ethnic composition ===
Goodhue County, Minnesota – Racial and ethnic composition Note: the US Census treats Hispanic/Latino as an ethnic category. This table excludes Latinos from the racial categories and assigns them to a separate category. Hispanics/Latinos may be of any race.
Race / Ethnicity (NH = Non-Hispanic)	Pop 1980	Pop 1990	Pop 2000	Pop 2010	Pop 2020	% 1980	% 1990	% 2000	% 2010	% 2020
White alone (NH)	38,223	39,982	42,405	43,027	42,516	98.64%	98.26%	96.10%	93.17%	89.35%
Black or African American alone (NH)	44	81	273	429	661	0.11%	0.20%	0.62%	0.93%	1.39%
Native American or Alaska Native alone (NH)	185	268	412	474	540	0.48%	0.66%	0.93%	1.03%	1.13%
Asian alone (NH)	151	176	250	271	348	0.39%	0.43%	0.57%	0.59%	0.73%
Native Hawaiian or Pacific Islander alone (NH)	x	x	12	17	33	x	x	0.03%	0.04%	0.07%
Other race alone (NH)	19	10	27	20	155	0.05%	0.02%	0.06%	0.04%	0.33%
Mixed race or Multiracial (NH)	x	x	275	603	1,532	x	x	0.62%	1.31%	3.22%
Hispanic or Latino (any race)	127	173	473	1,342	1,797	0.33%	0.43%	1.07%	2.91%	3.78%
Total	38,749	40,690	44,127	46,183	47,582	100.00%	100.00%	100.00%	100.00%	100.00%

=== 2020 census ===
As of the 2020 census, the county had a population of 47,582. The median age was 42.9 years. 22.4% of residents were under the age of 18 and 21.0% of residents were 65 years of age or older. For every 100 females there were 98.3 males, and for every 100 females age 18 and over there were 96.8 males age 18 and over.

The racial makeup of the county was 90.1% White, 1.4% Black or African American, 1.3% American Indian and Alaska Native, 0.7% Asian, 0.1% Native Hawaiian and Pacific Islander, 1.9% from some other race, and 4.5% from two or more races. Hispanic or Latino residents of any race comprised 3.8% of the population.

33.1% of residents lived in urban areas, while 66.9% lived in rural areas.

There were 19,499 households in the county, of which 27.7% had children under the age of 18 living in them. Of all households, 52.2% were married-couple households, 17.2% were households with a male householder and no spouse or partner present, and 23.1% were households with a female householder and no spouse or partner present. About 28.4% of all households were made up of individuals and 13.8% had someone living alone who was 65 years of age or older.

There were 20,864 housing units, of which 6.5% were vacant. Among occupied housing units, 76.7% were owner-occupied and 23.3% were renter-occupied. The homeowner vacancy rate was 1.2% and the rental vacancy rate was 5.6%.

=== 2000 census ===
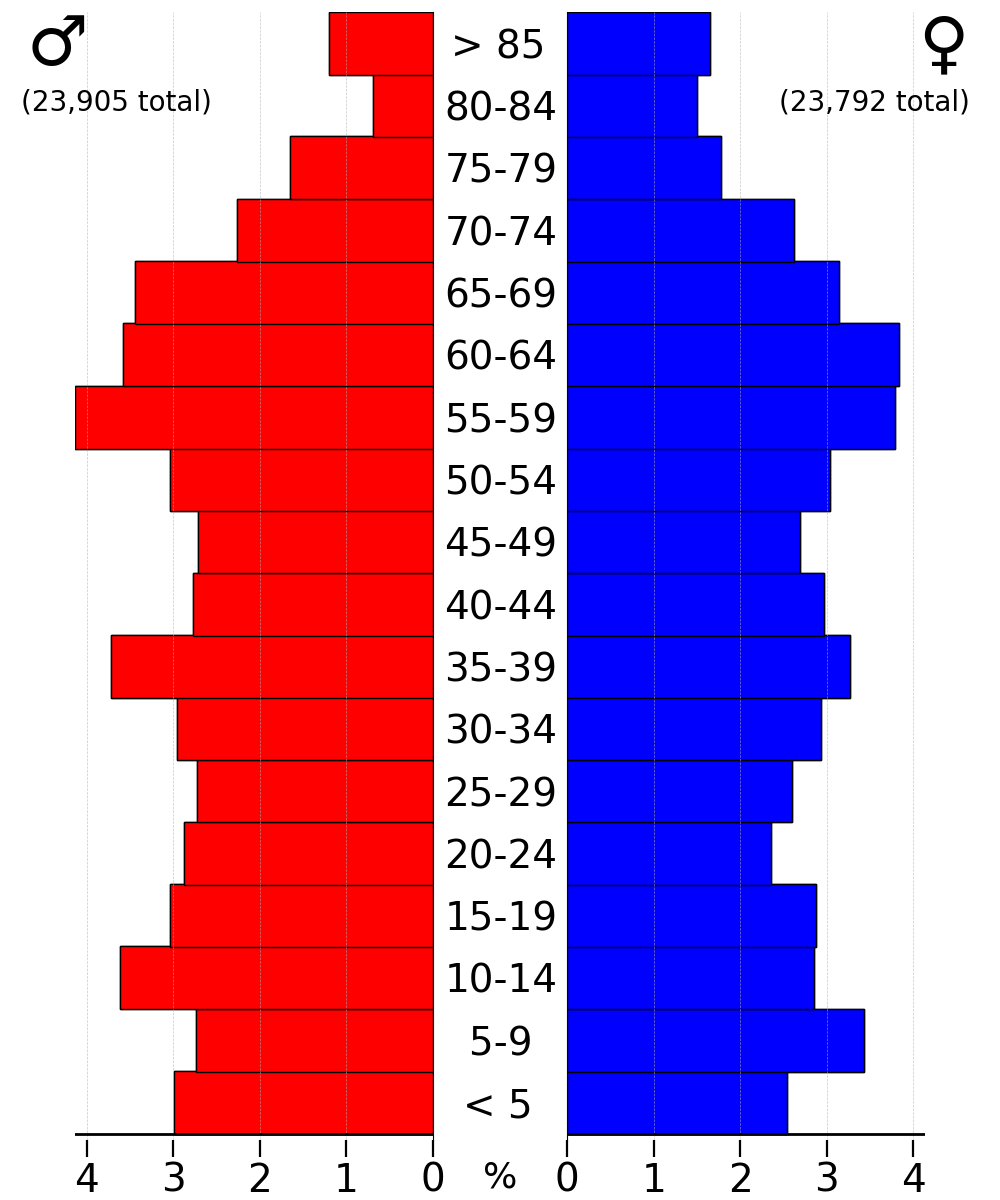
2022 US Census population pyramid for Goodhue County, from ACS 5-year estimates

As of the census of 2000, there were 44,127 people, 16,983 households, and 11,905 families in the county. The population density was 58.3 per square mile (22.5/km^{2}). There were 17,879 housing units at an average density of 23.6 per square mile (9.1/km^{2}). The racial makeup of the county was 96.57% White, 0.63% Black or African American, 0.98% Native American, 0.57% Asian, 0.03% Pacific Islander, 0.53% from other races, and 0.69% from two or more races. 1.07% of the population were Hispanic or Latino of any race.

There were 16,983 households, out of which 33.80% had children under the age of 18 living with them, 59.20% were married couples living together, 7.20% had a female householder with no husband present, and 29.90% were non-families. 25.20% of all households were made up of individuals, and 11.50% had someone living alone who was 65 years of age or older. The average household size was 2.53 and the average family size was 3.04.

The county population contained 26.50% under the age of 18, 7.40% from 18 to 24, 27.90% from 25 to 44, 23.20% from 45 to 64, and 15.00% who were 65 years of age or older. The median age was 38 years. For every 100 females there were 98.10 males. For every 100 females age 18 and over, there were 95.40 males.

The median income for a household in the county was $46,972, and the median income for a family was $55,689. Males had a median income of $36,282 versus $25,442 for females. The per capita income for the county was $21,934. About 3.70% of families and 5.70% of the population were below the poverty line, including 6.20% of those under age 18 and 8.60% of those age 65 or over.

== Communities ==
=== Cities ===
- Bellechester (part)
- Cannon Falls
- Dennison (part)
- Goodhue
- Kenyon
- Lake City (part)
- Pine Island (part)
- Red Wing (county seat)
- Wanamingo
- Zumbrota

=== Census-designated place ===
- Frontenac

=== Unincorporated communities ===
- Belle Creek
- Belvidere Mills
- Bombay
- Claybank
- Forest Mills
- Hader
- Hay Creek
- Roscoe
- Ryan
- Skyberg
- Sogn
- Stanton
- Vasa
- Wacouta
- Wangs
- Wastedo
- Welch
- White Rock

=== Ghost towns ===
- Central Point Township
- Fairpoint
- Florence
- Thoten/Belvidere

=== Townships ===
- Belle Creek Township
- Belvidere Township
- Cannon Falls Township
- Cherry Grove Township
- Featherstone Township
- Florence Township
- Goodhue Township
- Hay Creek Township
- Holden Township
- Kenyon Township
- Leon Township
- Minneola Township
- Pine Island Township
- Roscoe Township
- Stanton Township
- Vasa Township
- Wacouta Township
- Wanamingo Township
- Warsaw Township
- Welch Township
- Zumbrota Township

== Government and politics ==
Goodhue County usually leans Republican. It has selected the Republican nominee in all but two presidential elections since 1964, during both of Bill Clinton's successful runs in 1992 and 1996.

United States presidential election results for Goodhue County, Minnesota
Year	Republican		Democratic		Third party(ies)	
Year	No.	%	No.	%	No.	%
1892	3,574	61.60%	1,659	28.59%	569	9.81%
1896	5,748	77.87%	1,426	19.32%	208	2.82%
1900	4,894	78.54%	1,125	18.05%	212	3.40%
1904	4,562	83.43%	735	13.44%	171	3.13%
1908	4,482	74.89%	1,147	19.16%	356	5.95%
1912	1,051	18.31%	1,405	24.48%	3,283	57.21%
1916	3,471	61.39%	1,875	33.16%	308	5.45%
1920	9,330	85.07%	1,118	10.19%	520	4.74%
1924	6,849	59.05%	615	5.30%	4,135	35.65%
1928	9,752	72.93%	3,520	26.32%	100	0.75%
1932	5,486	41.22%	7,450	55.97%	374	2.81%
1936	5,682	39.57%	8,257	57.50%	422	2.94%
1940	9,095	58.09%	6,475	41.36%	86	0.55%
1944	7,820	57.17%	5,791	42.33%	68	0.50%
1948	6,704	47.14%	7,313	51.42%	205	1.44%
1952	10,422	67.26%	5,037	32.51%	35	0.23%
1956	9,365	65.25%	4,969	34.62%	19	0.13%
1960	10,473	65.16%	5,562	34.60%	38	0.24%
1964	6,539	41.95%	9,035	57.96%	15	0.10%
1968	8,283	51.89%	7,220	45.23%	461	2.89%
1972	11,107	63.00%	6,147	34.86%	377	2.14%
1976	9,967	51.59%	8,926	46.20%	428	2.22%
1980	9,329	46.07%	8,566	42.31%	2,353	11.62%
1984	11,171	55.92%	8,679	43.44%	128	0.64%
1988	9,455	49.50%	9,438	49.41%	209	1.09%
1992	7,321	34.45%	7,916	37.25%	6,013	28.30%
1996	7,293	35.89%	9,931	48.88%	3,094	15.23%
2000	10,852	48.76%	9,981	44.84%	1,424	6.40%
2004	13,134	51.29%	12,103	47.26%	371	1.45%
2008	12,775	49.53%	12,420	48.15%	600	2.33%
2012	12,986	50.33%	12,212	47.33%	603	2.34%
2016	14,041	54.60%	9,446	36.73%	2,230	8.67%
2020	16,052	56.06%	11,806	41.23%	778	2.72%
2024	16,461	57.12%	11,731	40.71%	625	2.17%

County Board of Commissioners
Position	Name	District	Next Election
Commissioner	Linda Flanders	District 1	2024
Commissioner	Brad Anderson	District 2	2026
Commissioner	Todd Greseth	District 3	2024
Commissioner	Jason Majerus	District 4	2026
Commissioner	Susan Betcher	District 5	2024

State Legislature (2018-2020)
Position	Name	Affiliation	District
Senate	Mike Goggin	Republican	District 21
Senate	Matt Little	Democrat	District 58
House of Representatives	Barb Haley	Republican	District 21A
House of Representatives	Steve Drazkowski	Republican	District 21B
House of Representatives	Pat Garofalo	Republican	District 58B

U.S Congress (2018-2020)
Position	Name	Affiliation	District
House of Representatives	Brad Finstad	Republican	1st
Senate	Amy Klobuchar	Democrat	N/A
Senate	Tina Smith	Democrat	N/A

== Education ==
School districts include:

- Cannon Falls Public School District
- Faribault Public Schools
- Goodhue Public School District
- Hastings Public School District
- Kenyon-Wanamingo School District
- Lake City Public School District
- Northfield Public School District
- Pine Island Public School District
- Randolph Public School District
- Red Wing Public Schools
- Triton School District
- Zumbrota-Mazeppa School District

== See also ==
- List of county roads in Goodhue County, Minnesota
- National Register of Historic Places listings in Goodhue County, Minnesota
