= Zumbrota Township, Goodhue County, Minnesota =

Zumbrota Township, Minnesota
- Township
- Location within the state of Minnesota Zumbrota Township, Minnesota (the United States)
- Coordinates: 44°19′53″N 92°37′18″W
- Country: United States
- State: Minnesota
- County: Goodhue

Area
  - Total: 34.8 sq mi (90.2 km^{2})
  - Land: 34.8 sq mi (90.2 km^{2})
  - Water: 0 sq mi (0.0 km^{2})
- Elevation: 1,129 ft (344 m)

Population (2000)
  - Total: 591
  - Density: 17/sq mi (6.5/km^{2})
- Time zone: UTC-6 (Central (CST))
  - Summer (DST): UTC-5 (CDT)
- ZIP code: 55992
- Area code: 507
- FIPS code: 27-72346
- GNIS feature ID: 0666077

Zumbrota Township is a township in Goodhue County, Minnesota, United States. The population was 591 at the 2000 census.

== History ==
Zumbrota Township was organized in 1858.

== Geography ==
According to the United States Census Bureau, the township has a total area of 34.8 square miles (90.2 km^{2}), all land.

== Demographics ==
As of the census of 2000, there were 591 people, 208 households, and 169 families residing in the township. The population density was 17.0 inhabitants per square mile (6.6/km^{2}). There were 214 housing units at an average density of 6.1 per square mile (2.4/km^{2}). The racial makeup of the township was 98.14% White, 0.34% African American, 0.34% Asian, 0.51% from other races, and 0.68% from two or more races. Hispanic or Latino of any race were 0.34% of the population.

There were 208 households, out of which 35.1% had children under the age of 18 living with them, 77.9% were married couples living together, 1.4% had a female householder with no husband present, and 18.8% were non-families. 14.9% of all households were made up of individuals, and 8.2% had someone living alone who was 65 years of age or older. The average household size was 2.84 and the average family size was 3.17.

In the township the population was spread out, with 26.7% under the age of 18, 8.3% from 18 to 24, 26.9% from 25 to 44, 25.9% from 45 to 64, and 12.2% who were 65 years of age or older. The median age was 39 years. For every 100 females, there were 111.8 males. For every 100 females age 18 and over, there were 109.2 males.

The median income for a household in the township was $62,188, and the median income for a family was $66,484. Males had a median income of $40,938 versus $26,023 for females. The per capita income for the township was $21,372. About 4.4% of families and 6.6% of the population were below the poverty line, including 10.3% of those under age 18 and 8.1% of those age 65 or over.
