= Minneola Township, Goodhue County, Minnesota =

Minneola Township, Minnesota
- Township
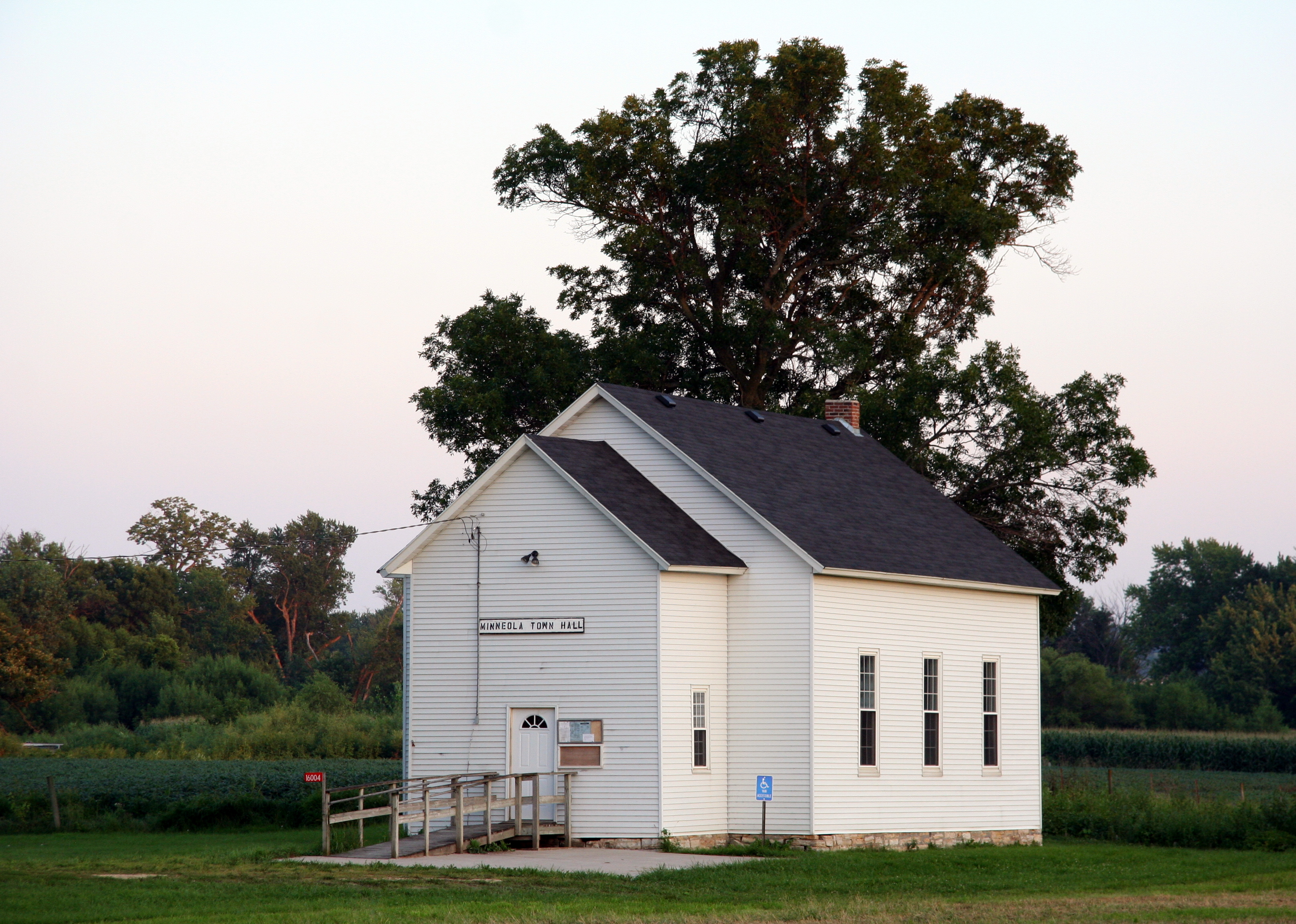
- Minneola Town Hall seen from U.S. Highway 52

- Location within the state of Minnesota Minneola Township, Minnesota (the United States)
- Coordinates: 44°19′17″N 92°44′3″W
- Country: United States
- State: Minnesota
- County: Goodhue

Area
  - Total: 33.9 sq mi (87.7 km^{2})
  - Land: 33.9 sq mi (87.7 km^{2})
  - Water: 0 sq mi (0.0 km^{2})
- Elevation: 1,050 ft (320 m)

Population (2000)
  - Total: 657
  - Density: 19/sq mi (7.5/km^{2})
- Time zone: UTC-6 (Central (CST))
  - Summer (DST): UTC-5 (CDT)
- FIPS code: 27-43072
- GNIS feature ID: 0664989

Minneola Township is a township in Goodhue County, Minnesota, United States. The population was 657 at the 2000 census.

Minneola Township was organized in 1859. Minneola is a name derived from the Dakota language meaning "much water".

== Geography ==
According to the United States Census Bureau, the township has a total area of 33.9 square miles (87.7 km^{2}), of which 33.9 square miles (87.7 km^{2}) is land and 0.03% is water.

== Demographics ==
As of the census of 2000, there were 657 people, 234 households, and 190 families residing in the township. The population density was 19.4 people per square mile (7.5/km^{2}). There were 239 housing units at an average density of 7.1/sq mi (2.7/km^{2}). The racial makeup of the township was 97.41% White, 0.15% African American, 0.15% Native American, 0.61% Asian, 0.61% from other races, and 1.07% from two or more races. Hispanic or Latino of any race were 0.15% of the population.

There were 234 households, out of which 38.9% had children under the age of 18 living with them, 75.2% were married couples living together, 3.8% had a female householder with no husband present, and 18.8% were non-families. 15.0% of all households were made up of individuals, and 5.6% had someone living alone who was 65 years of age or older. The average household size was 2.81 and the average family size was 3.13.

In the township the population was spread out, with 28.6% under the age of 18, 4.7% from 18 to 24, 28.6% from 25 to 44, 26.0% from 45 to 64, and 12.0% who were 65 years of age or older. The median age was 38 years. For every 100 females, there were 104.7 males. For every 100 females age 18 and over, there were 102.2 males.

The median income for a household in the township was $50,000, and the median income for a family was $54,167. Males had a median income of $34,875 versus $29,861 for females. The per capita income for the township was $23,329. None of the population or families were below the poverty line.
