= Warsaw Township, Goodhue County, Minnesota =

Warsaw Township, Minnesota
- Township
- Location within the state of Minnesota Warsaw Township, Minnesota (the United States)
- Coordinates: 44°24′58″N 92°58′16″W
- Country: United States
- State: Minnesota
- County: Goodhue

Area
  - Total: 34.6 sq mi (89.5 km^{2})
  - Land: 34.6 sq mi (89.5 km^{2})
  - Water: 0 sq mi (0.0 km^{2})
- Elevation: 1,135 ft (346 m)

Population (2000)
  - Total: 603
  - Density: 17/sq mi (6.7/km^{2})
- Time zone: UTC-6 (Central (CST))
  - Summer (DST): UTC-5 (CDT)
- FIPS code: 27-68242
- GNIS feature ID: 0665920
- Website: https://warsawtownship.com/

Warsaw Township is a township in Goodhue County, Minnesota, United States. The population was 603 at the 2000 census.

Warsaw Township was organized in 1858.

== Geography ==
According to the United States Census Bureau, the township has a total area of 34.6 square miles (89.5 km^{2}), all land.

== Demographics ==
As of the census of 2000, there were 603 people, 218 households, and 177 families residing in the township. The population density was 17.4 people per square mile (6.7/km^{2}). There were 223 housing units at an average density of 6.5/sq mi (2.5/km^{2}). The racial makeup of the township was 98.18% White, 0.17% African American, 0.33% Native American, 0.50% from other races, and 0.83% from two or more races. Hispanic or Latino of any race were 0.17% of the population.

There were 218 households, out of which 37.6% had children under the age of 18 living with them, 72.0% were married couples living together, 2.8% had a female householder with no husband present, and 18.8% were non-families. 14.2% of all households were made up of individuals, and 6.4% had someone living alone who was 65 years of age or older. The average household size was 2.77 and the average family size was 3.08.

In the township the population was spread out, with 28.7% under the age of 18, 5.3% from 18 to 24, 28.0% from 25 to 44, 29.2% from 45 to 64, and 8.8% who were 65 years of age or older. The median age was 40 years. For every 100 females, there were 121.7 males. For every 100 females age 18 and over, there were 113.9 males.

The median income for a household in the township was $65,179, and the median income for a family was $68,125. Males had a median income of $43,500 versus $25,625 for females. The per capita income for the township was $26,520. About 1.1% of families and 2.3% of the population were below the poverty line, including none of those under age 18 and 13.0% of those age 65 or over.
