= Cherry Grove Township, Goodhue County, Minnesota =

Cherry Grove Township, Minnesota
- Township
- Location within the state of Minnesota Cherry Grove Township, Minnesota (the United States)
- Coordinates: 44°14′7″N 92°51′0″W
- Country: United States
- State: Minnesota
- County: Goodhue

Area
  - Total: 38.3 sq mi (99.1 km^{2})
  - Land: 38.3 sq mi (99.1 km^{2})
  - Water: 0 sq mi (0.0 km^{2})
- Elevation: 1,230 ft (375 m)

Population (2000)
  - Total: 430
  - Density: 11/sq mi (4.3/km^{2})
- Time zone: UTC-6 (Central (CST))
  - Summer (DST): UTC-5 (CDT)
- FIPS code: 27-11188
- GNIS feature ID: 0663791

Cherry Grove Township is a township in Goodhue County, Minnesota, United States. The population was 430 at the 2000 census.

Cherry Grove Township was organized in 1858, and named for the groves of cherry trees within its borders.

== Geography ==
According to the United States Census Bureau, the township has a total area of 38.3 square miles (99 km^{2}), all of it land.

== Demographics ==
As of the census of 2000, there were 430 people, 150 households, and 117 families residing in the township. The population density was 11.2 inhabitants per square mile (4.3/km^{2}). There were 152 housing units at an average density of 4.0 per square mile (1.5/km^{2}). The racial makeup of the township was 99.07% White, 0.23% African American, and 0.70% from two or more races. Hispanic or Latino of any race were 0.70% of the population.

There were 150 households, out of which 37.3% had children under the age of 18 living with them, 74.7% were married couples living together, 2.7% had a female householder with no husband present, and 22.0% were non-families. 18.0% of all households were made up of individuals, and 10.0% had someone living alone who was 65 years of age or older. The average household size was 2.87 and the average family size was 3.27.

In the township the population was spread out, with 29.8% under the age of 18, 6.0% from 18 to 24, 28.8% from 25 to 44, 21.2% from 45 to 64, and 14.2% who were 65 years of age or older. The median age was 37 years. For every 100 females, there were 116.1 males. For every 100 females age 18 and over, there were 118.8 males.

The median income for a household in the township was $52,898, and the median income for a family was $54,191. Males had a median income of $33,542 versus $22,083 for females. The per capita income for the township was $20,093. About 5.7% of families and 3.8% of the population were below the poverty line, including none of those under age 18 and 17.6% of those age 65 or over.
