= Wanamingo, Minnesota =

City in Minnesota, United States

Wanamingo
- City
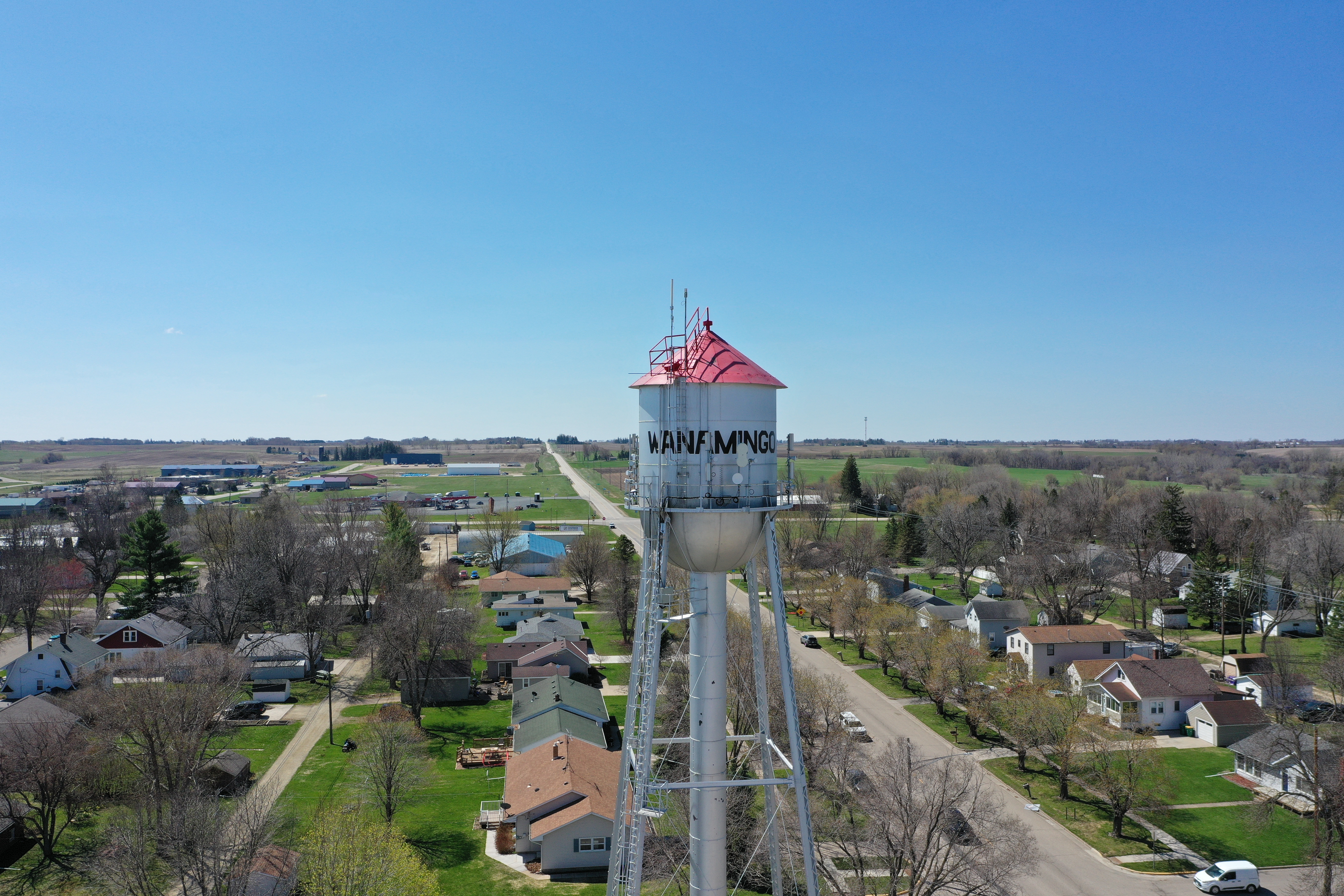
- Motto: "Poised For Tomorrow"

- Location of Wanamingo, Minnesota
- Coordinates: 44°18′9″N 92°47′29″W
- Country: United States
- State: Minnesota
- County: Goodhue

Government
  - Mayor: Ryan Holmes
  - City Administrator: Michael Boulton

Area
  - Total: 1.42 sq mi (3.67 km^{2})
  - Land: 1.42 sq mi (3.67 km^{2})
  - Water: 0 sq mi (0.00 km^{2})
- Elevation: 1,056 ft (322 m)

Population (2020)
  - Total: 1,113
  - Density: 785.3/sq mi (303.21/km^{2})
- Time zone: UTC-6 (Central (CST))
  - Summer (DST): UTC-5 (CDT)
- ZIP code: 55983
- Area code: 507
- FIPS code: 27-67972
- GNIS feature ID: 0653758
- Website: cityofwanamingo.com

Wanamingo is a community in Goodhue County, Minnesota, United States, incorporated as a city. It lies along the North Fork of the Zumbro River. As of the 2020 census, Wanamingo had a population of 1,113.

The ethanol company POET LLC started on the farm of Lowell Broin in 1983 near the community.

== Geography ==
According to the United States Census Bureau, the city has a total area of 1.40 square miles (3.63 km^{2}), all land.

Minnesota State Highways 57 and 60 are two of the main routes in the city.

U.S. Route 52 passes nearby.

== Demographics ==
Historical population
Census	Pop.	Note	%±
1920	350		—
1930	471		34.6%
1940	449		−4.7%
1950	496		10.5%
1960	540		8.9%
1970	574		6.3%
1980	717		24.9%
1990	847		18.1%
2000	1,007		18.9%
2010	1,086		7.8%
2020	1,113		2.5%
U.S. Decennial Census

=== 2010 census ===
As of the census of 2010, there were 1,086 people, 461 households, and 294 families living in the city. The population density was 775.7 inhabitants per square mile (299.5/km^{2}). There were 503 housing units at an average density of 359.3 per square mile (138.7/km^{2}). The racial makeup of the city was 97.6% White, 1.7% African American, 0.1% Asian, 0.3% from other races, and 0.4% from two or more races. Hispanic or Latino of any race were 1.1% of the population.

There were 461 households, of which 29.3% had children under the age of 18 living with them, 50.5% were married couples living together, 8.7% had a female householder with no husband present, 4.6% had a male householder with no wife present, and 36.2% were non-families. 31.0% of all households were made up of individuals, and 13.9% had someone living alone who was 65 years of age or older. The average household size was 2.31 and the average family size was 2.87.

The median age in the city was 38.4 years. 23.2% of residents were under the age of 18; 7.9% were between the ages of 18 and 24; 27.6% were from 25 to 44; 22% were from 45 to 64; and 19.2% were 65 years of age or older. The gender makeup of the city was 49.7% male and 50.3% female.

=== 2000 census ===
As of the census of 2000, there were 1,007 people, 404 households, and 273 families living in the city. The population density was 919.4 inhabitants per square mile (355.0/km^{2}). There were 411 housing units at an average density of 375.2 per square mile (144.9/km^{2}). The racial makeup of the city was 98.71% White, 0.40% Asian, and 0.89% from two or more races. Hispanic or Latino of any race were 0.20% of the population.

There were 404 households, out of which 32.4% had children under the age of 18 living with them, 58.4% were married couples living together, 5.7% had a female householder with no husband present, and 32.4% were non-families. 28.0% of all households were made up of individuals, and 15.6% had someone living alone who was 65 years of age or older. The average household size was 2.45 and the average family size was 3.04.

In the city, the population was spread out, with 26.8% under the age of 18, 6.9% from 18 to 24, 27.3% from 25 to 44, 20.1% from 45 to 64, and 19.0% who were 65 years of age or older. The median age was 37 years. For every 100 females, there were 100.6 males. For every 100 females age 18 and over, there were 99.2 males.

The median income for a household in the city was $40,000, and the median income for a family was $46,125. Males had a median income of $30,583 versus $23,295 for females. The per capita income for the city was $18,466. About 5.8% of families and 8.8% of the population were below the poverty line, including 4.7% of those under age 18 and 12.2% of those age 65 and over.
