= Wanamingo Township, Goodhue County, Minnesota =

Wanamingo Township, Minnesota
- Township
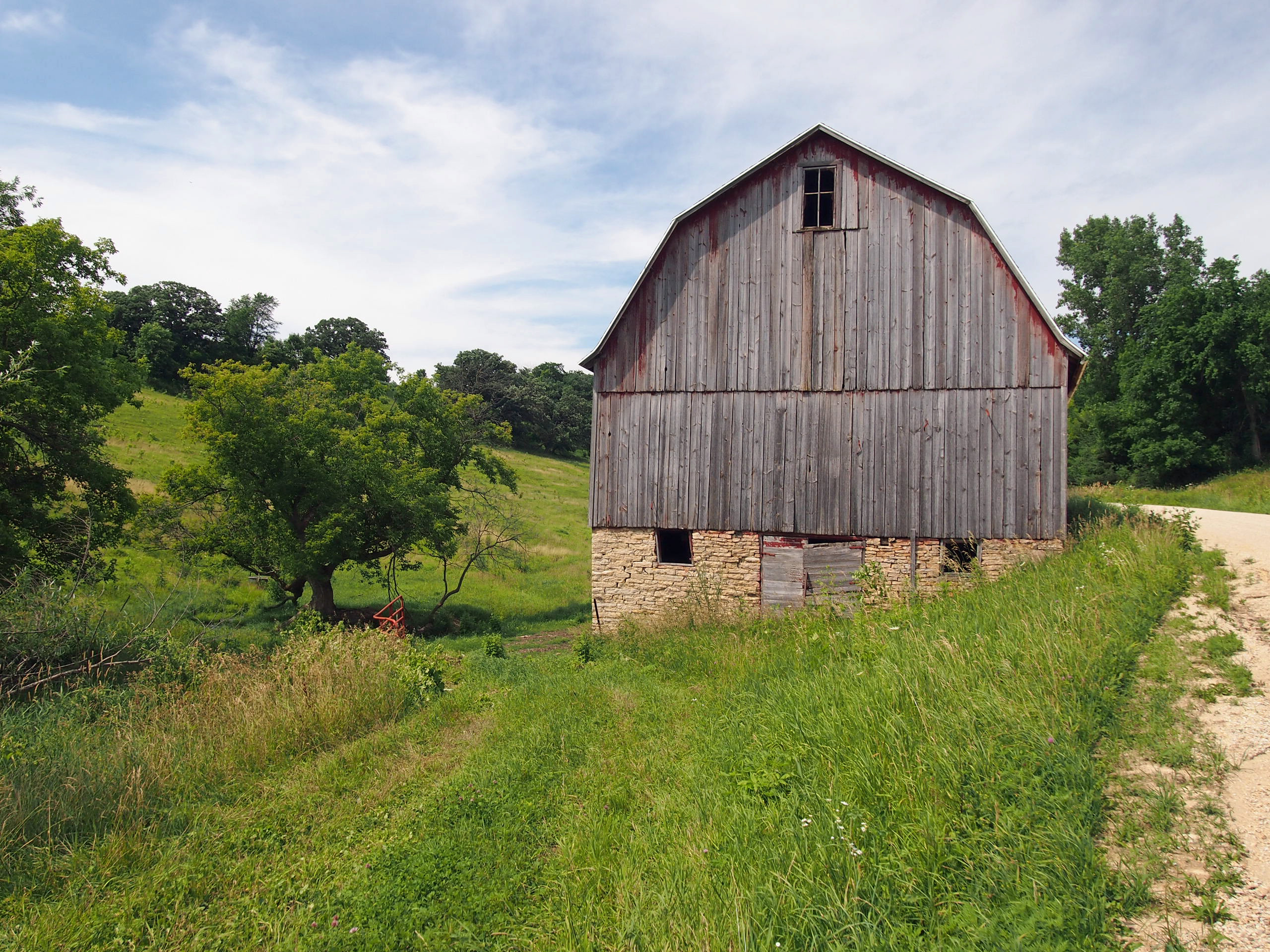
- A barn in Wanamingo Township

- Location within the state of Minnesota Wanamingo Township, Minnesota (the United States)
- Coordinates: 44°20′6″N 92°50′45″W
- Country: United States
- State: Minnesota
- County: Goodhue

Area
  - Total: 37.6 sq mi (97.4 km^{2})
  - Land: 37.6 sq mi (97.3 km^{2})
  - Water: 0 sq mi (0.0 km^{2})
- Elevation: 1,171 ft (357 m)

Population (2000)
  - Total: 504
  - Density: 13/sq mi (5.2/km^{2})
- Time zone: UTC-6 (Central (CST))
  - Summer (DST): UTC-5 (CDT)
- ZIP code: 55983
- Area code: 507
- FIPS code: 27-67990
- GNIS feature ID: 0665910
- Website: https://www.wanamingotownship.net/

Wanamingo Township is a township in Goodhue County, Minnesota, United States. The population was 504 at the 2000 census.

Wanamingo Township was organized in 1858.

== Geography ==
According to the United States Census Bureau, the township has a total area of 37.6 square miles (97.4 km^{2}), of which 37.6 square miles (97.3 km^{2}) is land and 0.03% is water.

== Demographics ==
As of the census of 2000, there were 504 people, 171 households, and 141 families residing in the township. The population density was 13.4 people per square mile (5.2/km^{2}). There were 177 housing units at an average density of 4.7/sq mi (1.8/km^{2}). The racial makeup of the township was 98.81% White, 0.40% Asian, 0.79% from other races. Hispanic or Latino of any race were 0.79% of the population.

There were 171 households, out of which 40.4% had children under the age of 18 living with them, 73.7% were married couples living together, 2.9% had a female householder with no husband present, and 17.5% were non-families. 14.6% of all households were made up of individuals, and 7.6% had someone living alone who was 65 years of age or older. The average household size was 2.95 and the average family size was 3.30.

In the township the population was spread out, with 30.4% under the age of 18, 6.2% from 18 to 24, 30.8% from 25 to 44, 21.8% from 45 to 64, and 10.9% who were 65 years of age or older. The median age was 38 years. For every 100 females, there were 128.1 males. For every 100 females age 18 and over, there were 127.9 males.

The median income for a household in the township was $42,500, and the median income for a family was $48,125. Males had a median income of $35,000 versus $25,179 for females. The per capita income for the township was $18,714. About 4.3% of families and 5.9% of the population were below the poverty line, including 9.8% of those under age 18 and none of those age 65 or over.
