= Goodhue, Minnesota =

City in Minnesota, United States

Goodhue
- City
- Location of Goodhue, Minnesota
- Coordinates: 44°24′02″N 92°37′26″W
- Country: United States
- State: Minnesota
- County: Goodhue

Area
  - Total: 1.10 sq mi (2.85 km^{2})
  - Land: 1.10 sq mi (2.85 km^{2})
  - Water: 0 sq mi (0.00 km^{2})
- Elevation: 1,122 ft (342 m)

Population (2020)
  - Total: 1,250
  - Density: 1,136.6/sq mi (438.85/km^{2})
- Time zone: UTC−6 (Central (CST))
  - Summer (DST): UTC−5 (CDT)
- ZIP Code: 55027
- Area code: 651
- FIPS code: 27-24398
- GNIS feature ID: 0644219
- Website: cityofgoodhue.gov

Goodhue is a city in Goodhue County, Minnesota, United States. As of the 2020 census, Goodhue had a population of 1,250.

== History ==
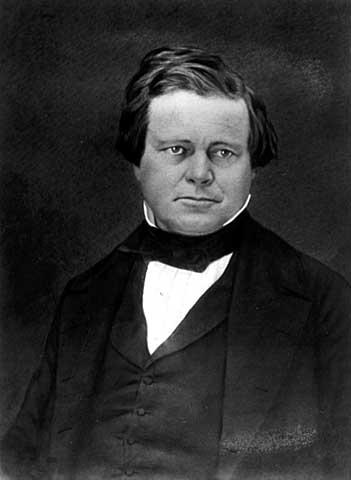
James M. Goodhue.

Goodhue was incorporated in 1889. Goodhue formerly had a rail line running through the eastern edge of the incorporated area, roughly parallel to and west of State Highway 58.

The Goodhue Area Historical Society constructed a museum in the community named in honor of James M. Goodhue, a newspaperman who was the first editor of the St. Paul Pioneer Press.

Since the mid-1990s, Goodhue, like many Midwestern municipalities with medium to large elevator operations, has seen its housing base and population grow.

The first significant growth in 20 years began with construction of several homes in an annexed area north of Third Avenue and west of Sixth Street known as "East side".

The Goodhue Wildcats won Class A State Championships in football in both 2003 and 2007, and the Goodhue Girls Basketball won the Class A State Championship in 2016, 2017, and 2024.

== Geography ==
According to the United States Census Bureau, the city has a total area of 0.94 square miles (2.43 km^{2}), all land.

Minnesota State Highway 58 and County Highway 9 are two of the main routes in the community.

The Goodhue K–12 High School is located on 510 3rd Avenue, Goodhue, MN 55027.

== Demographics ==
Historical population
Census	Pop.	Note	%±
1900	241		—
1910	408		69.3%
1920	398		−2.5%
1930	467		17.3%
1940	480		2.8%
1950	489		1.9%
1960	566		15.7%
1970	539		−4.8%
1980	657		21.9%
1990	533		−18.9%
2000	778		46.0%
2010	1,176		51.2%
2020	1,250		6.3%
U.S. Decennial Census

=== 2010 census ===
As of the census of 2010, there were 1,176 people, 415 households, and 307 families living in the city. The population density was 1,251.1 inhabitants per square mile (483.1/km^{2}). There were 443 housing units at an average density of 471.3 per square mile (182.0/km^{2}). The racial makeup of the city was 89.9% White, 0.3% African American, 0.9% Native American, 0.2% Asian, 7.7% from other races, and 1.0% from two or more races. Hispanic or Latino of any race were 12.8% of the population.

There were 415 households, of which 47.2% had children under the age of 18 living with them, 61.2% were married couples living together, 8.4% had a female householder with no husband present, 4.3% had a male householder with no wife present, and 26.0% were non-families. Of all households, 23.6% were made up of individuals, and 9.9% had someone living alone who was 65 years of age or older. The average household size was 2.83 and the average family size was 3.37.

The median age in the city was 30.6 years. 32.3% of residents were under the age of 18; 8.1% were between the ages of 18 and 24; 32.1% were from 25 to 44; 17.8% were from 45 to 64; and 9.4% were 65 years of age or older. The gender makeup of the city was 50.8% male and 49.2% female.

=== 2000 census ===
As of the census of 2000, there were 778 people, 293 households, and 196 families living in the city. The population density was 853.8 inhabitants per square mile (329.7/km^{2}). There were 298 housing units at an average density of 327.0 per square mile (126.3/km^{2}). The racial makeup of the city was 95.37% White, 0.13% Native American, 0.13% Asian, 3.34% from other races, and 1.03% from two or more races. Hispanic or Latino of any race were 5.01% of the population.

There were 293 households, out of which 35.5% had children under the age of 18 living with them, 58.0% were married couples living together, 6.1% had a female householder with no husband present, and 32.8% were non-families. Of all households, 27.3% were made up of individuals, and 13.0% had someone living alone who was 65 years of age or older. The average household size was 2.66 and the average family size was 3.28.

In the city, the population was spread out, with 29.2% under the age of 18, 9.3% from 18 to 24, 29.4% from 25 to 44, 17.6% from 45 to 64, and 14.5% who were 65 years of age or older. The median age was 32 years. For every 100 females, there were 102.6 males. For every 100 females age 18 and over, there were 104.1 males.

The median income for a household in the city was $43,250, and the median income for a family was $49,531. Males had a median income of $32,031 versus $21,765 for females. The per capita income for the city was $15,873. About 1.0% of families and 3.4% of the population were below the poverty line, including none of those under age 18 and 11.3% of those age 65 or over.

== Notable people ==
- Gerald Heaney, United States federal appellate court judge, was born in Goodhue.
- Victor H. Schulz, Minnesota state legislator and farmer, lived in Goodhue.
