= Cannon Falls, Minnesota =

City in Minnesota, United States

- City
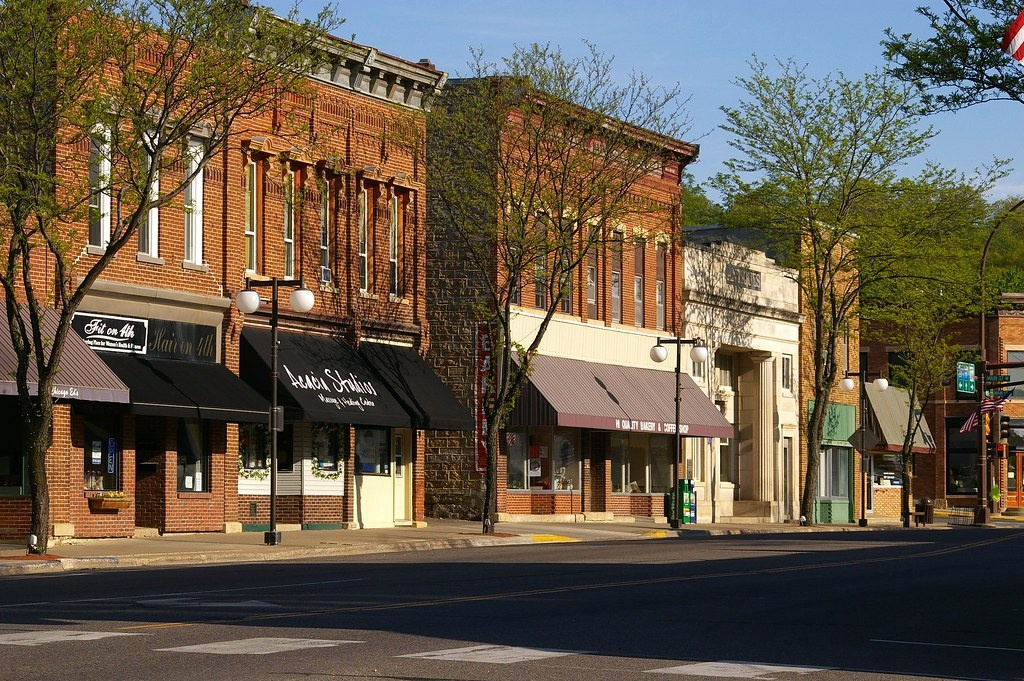
- Downtown Cannon Falls

- Location of Cannon Falls, Minnesota

- Location within the United States
- Coordinates: 44°30′37″N 92°54′16″W
- Country: United States
- State: Minnesota
- County: Goodhue

Government
  - Mayor: Matt Montgomery
  - City Administrator: Jon Radermacher

Area
  - Total: 4.59 sq mi (11.89 km^{2})
  - Land: 4.49 sq mi (11.63 km^{2})
  - Water: 0.10 sq mi (0.26 km^{2})
- Elevation: 837 ft (255 m)

Population (2020)
  - Total: 4,220
  - Density: 940.0/sq mi (362.93/km^{2})
- Time zone: UTC−6 (Central (CST))
  - Summer (DST): UTC−5 (CDT)
- ZIP Code: 55009
- Area code: 507
- FIPS code: 27-09730
- GNIS feature ID: 0640870
- Website: cannonfallsmn.gov

Cannon Falls is a city in Goodhue County, Minnesota, United States. The population was 4,220 at the 2020 census. Located along U.S. Route 52, southeast of the Twin Cities, Cannon Falls is the home of Pachyderm Studios, where many famous musicians have recorded, including Nirvana, which recorded its 1993 album In Utero there.

Cannon Falls is named for the falls along the Cannon River and serves as the western trailhead for the Cannon Valley Trail.

== History ==
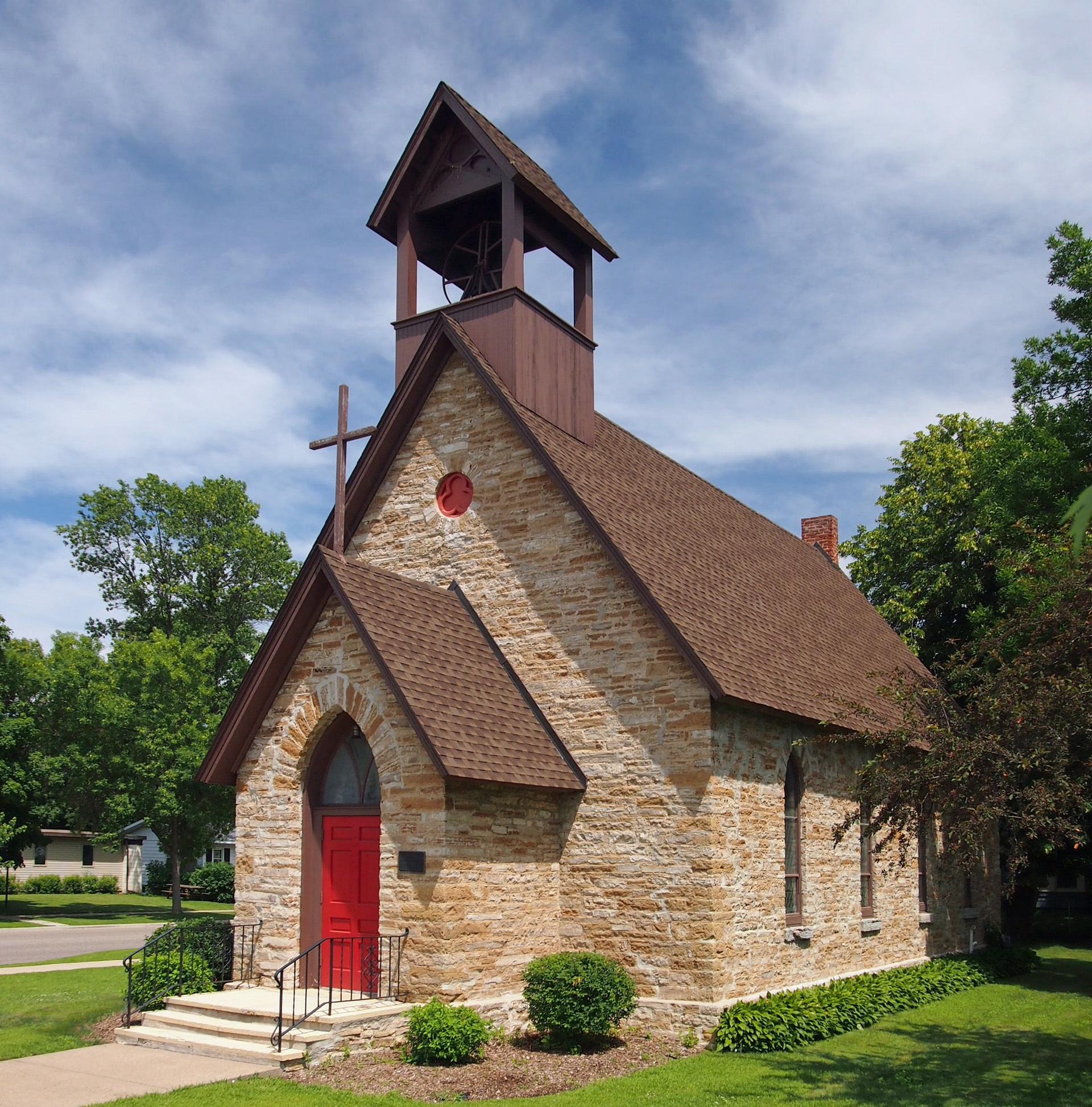
Redeemer Episcopal, the oldest church in Cannon Falls

The first settler was Edway Stoughton. A Charles Parks settled the land that is now Cannon Falls in July 1854. Cannon Falls village proper was laid out by Richard and William Freeborn and platted in 1855 by county surveyor S. A. Hart. The village was incorporated March 10, 1857. A post office was established as Cannon River Falls in 1855, and the name was shortened to Cannon Falls in 1889. Cannon Falls was reincorporated as a city in 1905.

An abundance of water power from both the Big and Little Cannon Rivers attracted manufacturers and capital investment. The first flouring mill was built by R. C. Knox & Co., in 1857. Other manufacturers, such as a wool mill, a grist mill, and a mill producing syrup from amber cane, used power generated from the Little Cannon River starting in 1861.

Cannon Falls burned twice in the 1880s. On May 21, 1884, around midnight, several downtown buildings burned, starting with A.B. Sather's general merchandise store. The mill pond was used as a reservoir, but wooden buildings soon burned. Volunteers and firefighters focused on saving a stone building, and moved flammable goods onto the street. Thanks to rain, the fire was controlled. At the time, the city had no water system or fire fighting equipment.

Three years later, on May 20, 1887, another fire began behind Ben Rodger's saloon. The saloon was one of eight wood-frame structures and all went up in flame within a half hour. Winds spread the fire across the street. Despite the efforts of firefighters, the fire continued to spread throughout the neighborhood. One building was saved by a bucket brigade. At the end of the fire, 27 businesses, along with buildings and houses were destroyed.

In response to the fires, the city enacted new building codes, installed a city water system, organized a fire company, and built a Fireman's Hall in 1888.

=== Presidential visits ===
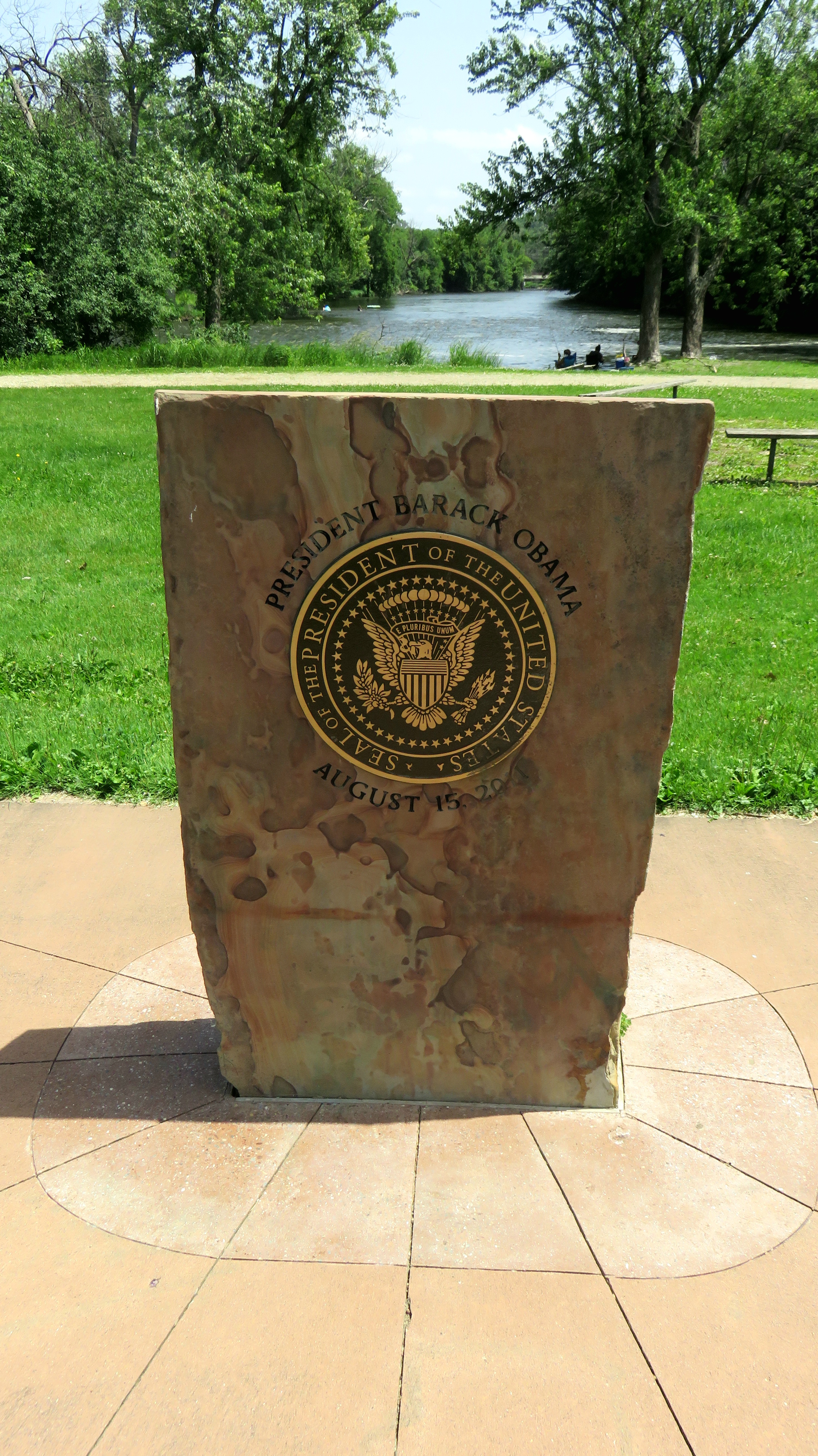
Monument dedicated to Barack Obama's visit to Cannon Falls on August 15, 2011

Two sitting US presidents have made visits to Cannon Falls. On July 29, 1928, Calvin Coolidge traveled to the city to dedicate a memorial to Colonel William J. Colvill at the Cannon Falls Cemetery. On August 15, 2011, Barack Obama held a town hall meeting in Hannah's Bend Park on the banks of the Cannon River.

== Geography ==
According to the United States Census Bureau, the city has a total area of 4.45 square miles (11.53 km^{2}), of which 4.35 square miles (11.27 km^{2}) is land and 0.10 square miles (0.26 km^{2}) is water. U.S. Highway 52, State Highways 19 and 20, and County Road 24 are the main routes in the city.

Lake Byllesby, a reservoir of the Cannon River, lies just west of town.

== Demographics ==
=== 2020 census ===
As of the 2020 census, Cannon Falls had a population of 4,220. The median age was 42.4 years. 21.1% of residents were under the age of 18 and 20.3% of residents were 65 years of age or older. For every 100 females there were 96.0 males, and for every 100 females age 18 and over there were 93.4 males age 18 and over.

0.0% of residents lived in urban areas, while 100.0% lived in rural areas.

There were 1,855 households in Cannon Falls, of which 25.0% had children under the age of 18 living in them. Of all households, 44.5% were married-couple households, 20.0% were households with a male householder and no spouse or partner present, and 28.6% were households with a female householder and no spouse or partner present. About 35.9% of all households were made up of individuals and 17.3% had someone living alone who was 65 years of age or older.

There were 1,953 housing units, of which 5.0% were vacant. The homeowner vacancy rate was 1.1% and the rental vacancy rate was 4.6%.

Racial composition as of the 2020 census
Race	Number	Percent
White	3,923	93.0%
Black or African American	9	0.2%
American Indian and Alaska Native	17	0.4%
Asian	34	0.8%
Native Hawaiian and Other Pacific Islander	4	0.1%
Some other race	49	1.2%
Two or more races	184	4.4%
Hispanic or Latino (of any race)	100	2.4%

=== 2010 census ===
As of the census of 2010, there were 4,083 people, 1,708 households, and 1,061 families living in the city. The population density was 938.6 inhabitants per square mile (362.4/km^{2}). There were 1,869 housing units at an average density of 429.7 per square mile (165.9/km^{2}). The racial makeup of the city was 94.3% White, 2.4% African American, 0.5% Native American, 0.5% Asian, 0.8% from other races, and 1.5% from two or more races. Hispanic or Latino of any race were 2.2% of the population.

Historical population
Census	Pop.	Note	%±
1880	942		—
1890	1,078		14.4%
1900	1,239		14.9%
1910	1,385		11.8%
1920	1,315		−5.1%
1930	1,358		3.3%
1940	1,544		13.7%
1950	1,831		18.6%
1960	2,055		12.2%
1970	2,072		0.8%
1980	2,653		28.0%
1990	3,232		21.8%
2000	3,795		17.4%
2010	4,083		7.6%
2020	4,220		3.4%
U.S. Decennial Census

There were 1,708 households, of which 31.9% had children under the age of 18 living with them, 48.2% were married couples living together, 10.2% had a female householder with no husband present, 3.7% had a male householder with no wife present, and 37.9% were non-families. Of all households, 32.1% were made up of individuals, and 15% had someone living alone who was 65 years of age or older. The average household size was 2.33 and the average family size was 2.96.

The median age in the city was 40 years. 23.9% of residents were under the age of 18; 7.4% were between the ages of 18 and 24; 25.3% were from 25 to 44; 26.5% were from 45 to 64; and 17% were 65 years of age or older. The gender makeup of the city was 48.3% male and 51.7% female.

=== 2000 census ===
As of the census of 2000, there were 3,795 people, 1,550 households, and 996 families living in the city. The population density was 946.4 inhabitants per square mile (365.4/km^{2}). There were 1,611 housing units at an average density of 401.8 per square mile (155.1/km^{2}). The racial makeup of the city was 98.18% White, 0.18% African American, 0.29% Native American, 0.66% Asian, 0.42% from other races, and 0.26% from two or more races. Hispanic or Latino of any race were 1.08% of the population.

There were 1,550 households, out of which 32.6% had children under the age of 18 living with them, 51.4% were married couples living together, 9.7% had a female householder with no husband present, and 35.7% were non-families. Of all households, 31.2% were made up of individuals, and 14.8% had someone living alone who was 65 years of age or older. The average household size was 2.40 and the average family size was 3.03.

In the city, the population was spread out, with 26.5% under the age of 18, 7.6% from 18 to 24, 29.2% from 25 to 44, 19.5% from 45 to 64, and 17.2% who were 65 years of age or older. The median age was 37 years. For every 100 females, there were 94.3 males. For every 100 females age 18 and over, there were 89.9 males.

The median income for a household in the city was $40,721, and the median income for a family was $53,903. Males had a median income of $37,095 versus $24,906 for females. The per capita income for the city was $20,820. About 3.5% of families and 5.6% of the population were below the poverty line, including 5.7% of those under age 18 and 8.7% of those age 65 or over.

== Government ==
The city uses a mayor–city administrator governmental system. Matt Montgomery is mayor, and Jon Radermacher is the City Administrator.

The Cannon Falls Library is the city's public library. It is a member of Southeastern Libraries Cooperating, the SE Minnesota library region. The director is Justin Padgett. In the late 20th century, the Library occupied Fireman's Hall, an 1888 Italianate limestone building with two arched entrances and four arched windows along the facade. Fireman's Hall is now the home of the local Historical Society.

== Education ==
Cannon Falls Area Schools 252
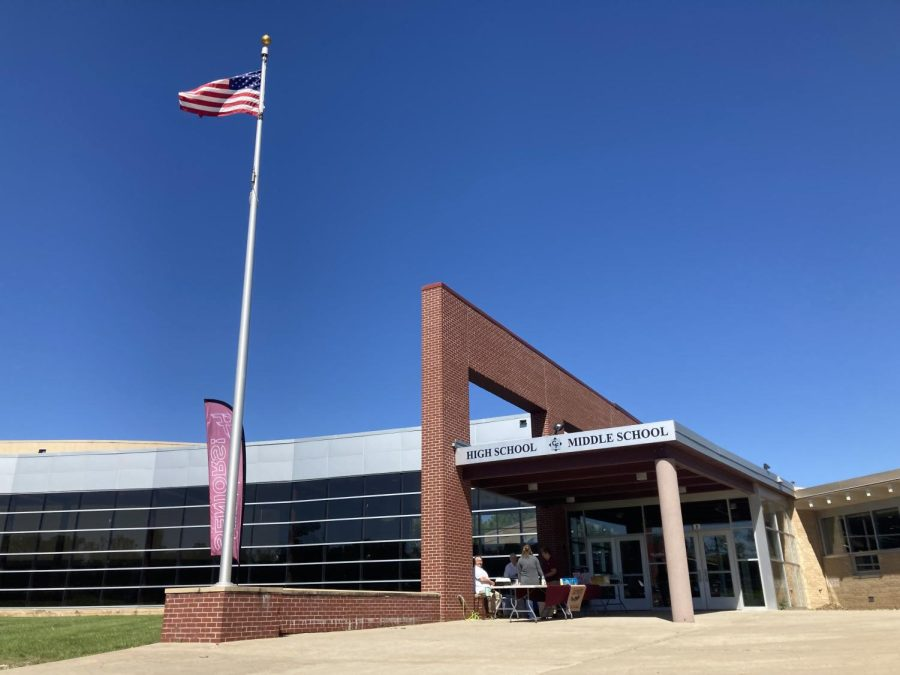
- Cannon Falls Middle/High school

District information
- Grades: K–12
- Established: 1893; 133 years ago
- NCES District ID: 2707500
- District ID: 252

Students and staff
- Students: 1,149
- Teachers: 94
- Staff: 203

Other information
- Website: cannonfallsschools.com

The public school district located in Cannon Falls, Minnesota was founded in 1893. It comprises Cannon Falls High School, Cannon Falls Middle School, and Cannon Falls Elementary School.

=== High and middle schools ===
The high school and middle school share a site. Enrollment in grades 6 through 12 was 750 students as of the 2017/2018 school year. As of 2023 the principal is Tim Hodges, and the district superintendent is Jeff Sampson.

Supported sports teams

- Football (M, W)
- Baseball (M)
- Basketball (M, W)
- Cheerleading (W)
- Cross Country (M, W)
- Dance Team (W)
- Drama (M, W)
- Golf (M, W)
- Soccer (M, W)
- Softball (W)
- Speech (M, W)
- Tennis (W)
- Track (M, W)
- Trap shooting (M, W)
- Volleyball (W)
- Weightlifting (M, W)
- Wrestling (M)

=== Elementary school ===
Grades K–5 have an enrollment total of 607 students. The current principal as of 2023 is Jennifer Chappuis. While the high school has the name Bombers as their mascot, the elementary school has adopted the name Trailblazers, due to criticisms of the old name's violent connotations.

=== Private schools ===
St. Paul's Lutheran School is a Christian pre-school and K–8 school of the Wisconsin Evangelical Lutheran Synod (WELS) in Cannon Falls.

== Religion ==
St. Paul's Lutheran Church is a member of the Wisconsin Evangelical Lutheran Synod (WELS) in Cannon Falls. The Episcopal Church of the Redeemer is listed on the National Register of Historic Places.

== Notable people ==
Colonel William J. Colvill, a hero of the Battle of Gettysburg, is buried in the Cannon Falls Cemetery. American singer-songwriter Caitlyn Smith was born here June 13, 1986.

== See also ==
- Cannon Falls Public Library
