= Sts. Anne and Joachim Catholic Church =

- Sts. Anne and Joachim Catholic Church
- 46°48′9″N 96°49′3″W
- Location: Fargo, North Dakota
- Country: United States of America
- Language: English,
- Denomination: Roman Catholic
- Website: stsaaj.org

History
- Status: Open
- Founded: 1995
- Founder: Monsignor Valentine G. Gross
- Dedicated: February 11, 2010.

Architecture
- Functional status: Open
- Architect: Zerr Berg Architects
- Style: neo-Gothic
- Years built: 1995-2010
- Completed: 2010

Specifications
- Capacity: 1,200
- Length: 212 ft (65 m)
- Width: 120 ft (37 m)
- Height: 130 ft (40 m)
- Materials: Steel, Concrete, Plaster, Brick

Administration
- Province: Saint Paul and Minneapolis
- Archdiocese: Saint Paul and Minneapolis
- Diocese: Roman Catholic Diocese of Fargo
- Deanery: Deanery 2: Fargo
- Parish: Sts. Anne and Joachim Catholic Church in Fargo

Clergy
- Archbishop: Bernard Hebda
- Bishop: John Folda
- Vicar: Fr. Robert Foertsch
- Dean: Rev. Gerard Braun
- Pastor: Fr. Luke Meyer

Sts. Anne and Joachim is a Roman Catholic church located in Fargo, North Dakota, within the Diocese of Fargo. Planning for the church began in 1995 and was completed in 2010. The rites of dedication were on February 11, 2010, by Samuel J. Aquila. The church was named after Saint Anne and Saint Joachim, the parents of Mary, mother of Jesus. Sts. Anne and Joachim parish was founded by Monsignor Valentine Gross after Bishop James Stephen Sullivan asked him to start a new parish in South Fargo.

== Construction ==
Sts. Anne and Joachim church was built in a two phase construction. Phase 1 included a gathering space and a social hall and was completed in 2001. Phase 2 included a permanent worship area, costing the church $9–10 Million. In addition to the phase 2 primary worship area, the phase 2 structure is home to an adoration and daily chapels. The church houses numerous shrines and confessionals.

== Organizations ==
- Knights of Columbus (The Sts. Anne & Joachim Council #11930 of the Knights of Columbus )
- Essentia (EMHC)
- Social Concerns
- St. Bakhata's Community
- Respect Life
- Parish Nursing
- MACH 1
- Prayer Quilt Ministry

== Relics ==
Ten Commandments shown in front of Sts. Anne and Joachim Catholic Church.

In the marble altar at Sts. Anne and Joachim Church is a reliquary containing numerous bone fragments of saints behind grate-like doors. Each tiny fragment is housed in its own casing, with a window so that the object can be seen.

Relic: bone fragments of Saint Anne and Joachim. The altar of the church houses what is believed to be bone fragments of the church's patron saints.

Relic: bone fragment of St. Thomas Aquinas.

Relic: bone fragment of St. Josephine Bakhita. This Sudanese saint is the patron saint of the Sudanese community that meets at the church.

Relic: St. Anthony of Padua. He is often invoked for help in finding lost articles, St. Anthony of Padua was canonized a year after his death in 1231.

Relic: bone fragment of St. Gemma Galgani. This Catholic mystic born in Italy in 1878 is said to have received the stigmata, or the wounds of Jesus, on her own body.

Relic: bone fragment of St. Maria Goretti. She is reputed to have been killed by a would-be rapist to whom she refused to submit. As she laid dying, tradition holds that she forgave her attacker.

Relic: bone fragment of St. Elizabeth Ann Seton. She is the first native-born American to be canonized by the Catholic Church.
