= Belle Creek =

Belle Creek may refer to:

- Belle Creek (Cannon River), a stream in Minnesota
- Belle Creek (Crow River), a stream in Minnesota
- Belle Creek Township, Goodhue County, Minnesota
- Belle Creek, Minnesota, an unincorporated community
- Belle Creek, Montana, an unincorporated community
