= St. James Basilica (Jamestown, North Dakota) =

Historic church in North Dakota, United States

- St. James Catholic Church
- U.S. National Register of Historic Places
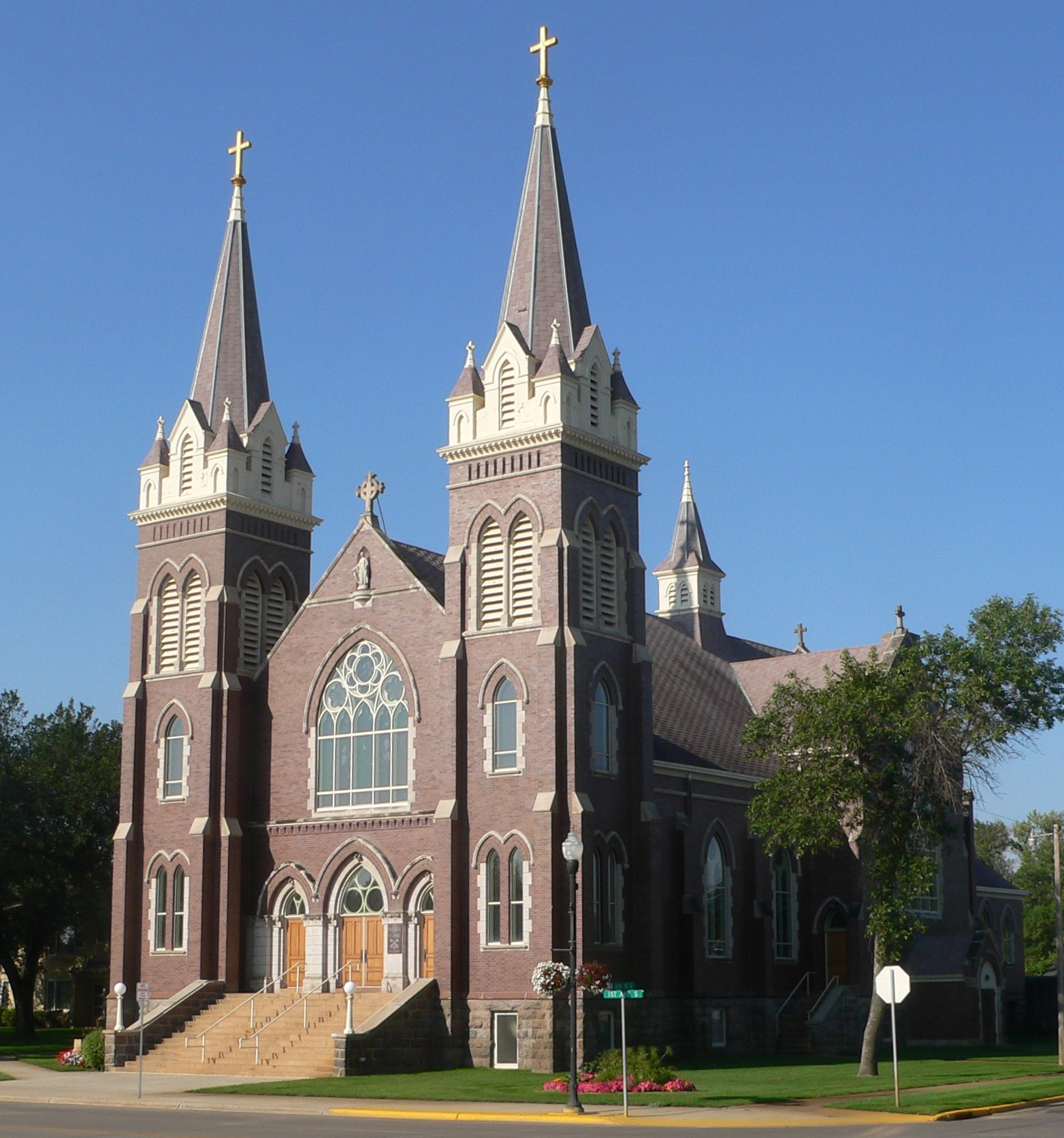

- Location within North Dakota Location within the United States
- Interactive map of St. James Catholic Church
- Location: 622 1st Ave., S., Jamestown, North Dakota
- Coordinates: 46°54′10″N 98°42′32″W
- Built: 1910–1914
- Built by: Jeff Shelde
- Architect: Hancock Brothers
- Architectural style: Late Gothic Revival
- NRHP reference No.: 82001346
- Added to NRHP: October 22, 1982

St. James Basilica is a Latin Catholic parish church in the Diocese of Fargo as well as a minor basilica located in Jamestown, North Dakota, United States. A previous church building, completed in 1882, served briefly as a cathedral in the 19th century. The present church building was listed on the National Register of Historic Places in 1982 as St. James Catholic Church, and it was elevated to a minor basilica in 1988.

== History ==
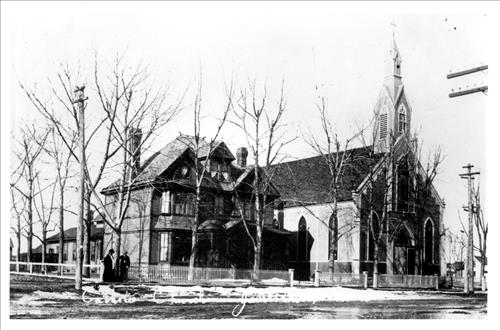
The 1882 church and the old rectory. The church served as a cathedral the 1890s.

Catholics settled in the Jamestown area as early as 1872, and the first Mass was celebrated in the town on January 10, 1879. As the congregation had no building to call its own for three years, they met in hotels, school buildings, and meeting halls. They also did not have a pastor so they were served by visiting clergy. Father Flannigan became the parish's first pastor in 1882. He raised $6,000 to build a frame church that measured 86 by 60 feet (26 by 18 m), and a small rectory next door. They were completed in June 1882. Anton Klaus, a prominent Jamestown citizen, donated the block on which the buildings were built. It was dedicated by Bishop Martin Marty, OSB on May 13, 1883.

On November 10, 1889 Pope Leo XIII established the Diocese of Jamestown, and St. James became the cathedral church for the new diocese. Bishop John Shanley was installed as bishop. He established St. John's Academy, added a sacristy to the cathedral, renovated the rectory, and convened the first Catholic Congress of the Dakotas in 1891. The later was an annual meeting to aid the Native Americans in North Dakota. Shanley found running the diocese from Jamestown difficult and moved to Fargo in 1891. He had the Cathedral of St. Mary built there and the See City was transferred to Fargo on April 6, 1897.

By the early 20th century it became obvious that a new church was needed. Under the direction of the Rev. Edward J. Geraghty and Michael Murphy, a local banker and contractor who led the building committee, the Hancock Brothers of Fargo designed a new church in the Gothic Revival style. Jeff Shelde from Litchfield, Minnesota was chosen as the contractor. The groundbreaking took place in 1910 and it took four years to build the church. Bishop James O'Reilly consecrated it on November 29, 1914.

A major building program took place from 1956 to 1958. A new and larger rectory was designed by the Minneapolis architectural firm of Hills, Gilbertson and Hayes. The basement of the church was transformed into a parish hall and the interior of the worship space was updated. The renovation included a new paint scheme and simplified altar furnishings.

On October 26, 1988 Pope John Paul II elevated St. James Church to the rank of a minor basilica. Bishop James S. Sullivan presided at the dedication liturgy on July 23, 1989. The Apostolic Brief, which raised St. James to the basilica status, is located near the southwest entrance into the church building.

== Architecture ==
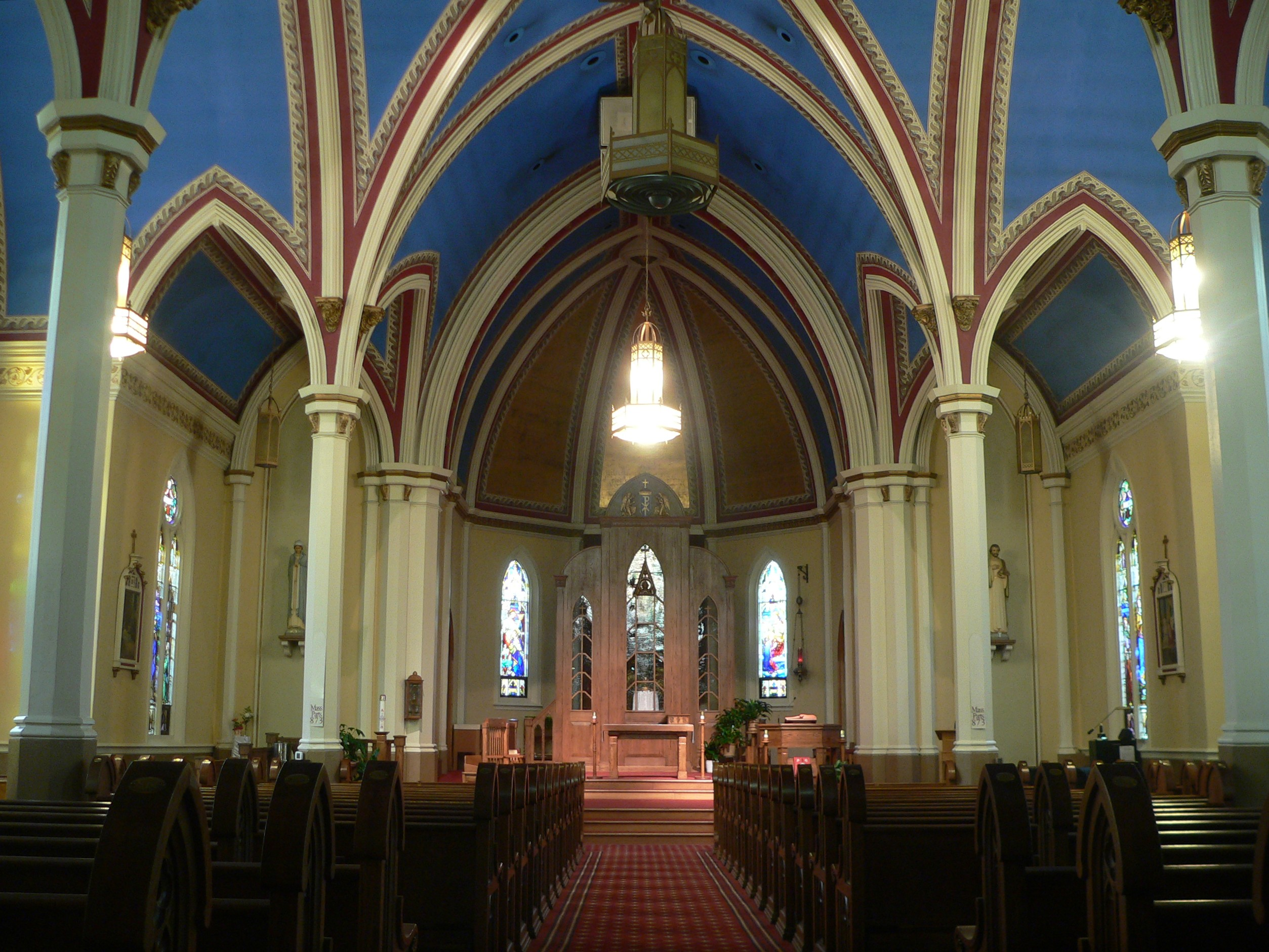
Interior of the basilica

The basilica is a cross-shaped structure that measures 140 by 50 feet (43 by 15 m) and 70 feet (21 m) at the transept. The building itself is 42 feet (13 m) high and the twin towers that flank the main facade are 125 feet (38 m). The spires on the towers are capped with 23 carat gold-leaf crosses. The foundation is rock faced, trimmed granite. The exterior walls are covered in Hebron brick and they are trimmed in Bedford stone. The seating capacity of the church is 650 with another 100 able to fit in the choir loft. The stained glass windows that depict scenes from the life of Christ were installed by the Pittsburgh Plate Glass Company in 1918.
