= Aloisius Joseph Muench =

American prelate

His Eminence Aloisius Joseph Muench
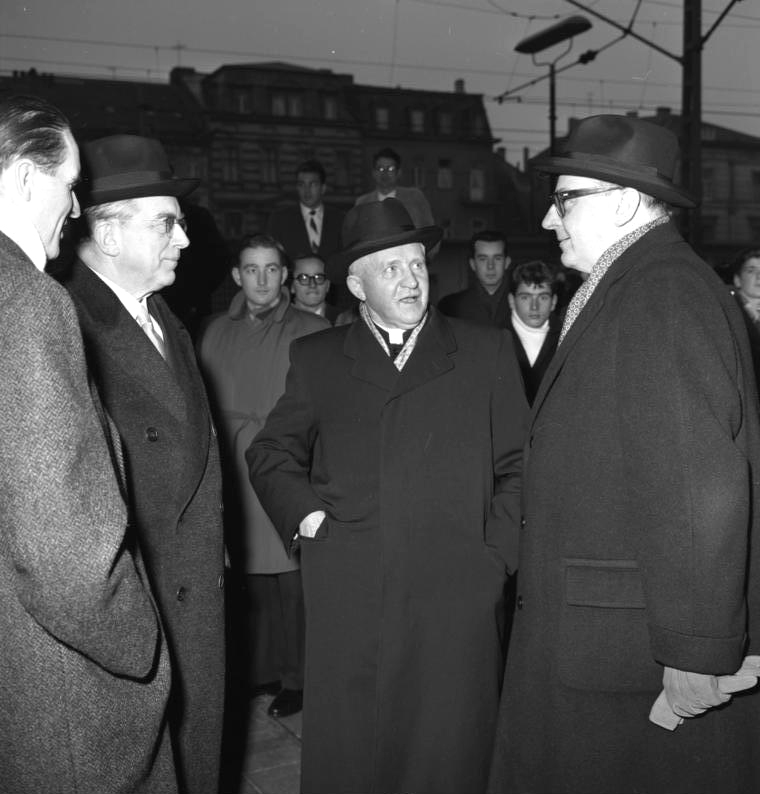
- Muench (center) in Bonn in 1959
- Diocese: Roman Catholic Diocese of Fargo, North Dakota
- See: Bishop of Fargo
- Installed: November 6, 1935
- Term ended: December 9, 1959
- Predecessor: James O'Reilly
- Successor: Leo Dworschak

Orders
- Ordination: June 8, 1916
- Consecration: October 15, 1935
- Created cardinal: December 14, 1959
- Rank: Cardinal-priest

Personal details
- Born: February 18, 1889 Milwaukee, Wisconsin
- Died: February 15, 1962 (aged 72) Rome, Italy
- Buried: Fargo, North Dakota
- Denomination: Roman Catholic

Ordination history of Aloisius Joseph Muench
History
Episcopal consecration
- Consecrated by: Amleto Giovanni Cicognani
- Date: October 15, 1935
Episcopal succession
Bishops consecrated by Aloisius Joseph Muench as principal consecrator
- Vincent James Ryan: May 28, 1940
- William Theodore Mulloy: January 10, 1945
- Johannes Bydolek: September 21, 1949
- Matthias Wehr: October 29, 1951
- Opilio Rossi: December 27, 1953

Styles of Aloisius Joseph Muench
- Reference style: His Eminence; The Most Reverend Eminence
- Spoken style: Your Eminence
- Religious style: Cardinal
- Informal style: Cardinal

Aloisius Joseph Muench (February 18, 1889 – February 15, 1962) was an American prelate of the Roman Catholic Church. He served as bishop of Fargo in North Dakota from 1935 to 1959, and as apostolic nuncio to Germany from 1951 to 1959. He was elevated to the cardinalate in 1959.

Muench was the most powerful American Catholic and Vatican representative in Allied-occupied Germany and subsequently in West Germany from 1946 to 1959. He served as the liaison between the U.S. Office of Military Government and the German Catholic Church in the American occupation zone (1946–1949), Pope Pius XII's apostolic visitor to Germany (1946–1947), the Vatican relief officer in Kronberg im Taunus, Germany (1947–1949), regent in Kronberg (1949–1951), as well as nuncio to Germany.

== Early life and education ==
Muench was born on February 18, 1889, in Milwaukee, Wisconsin, to Joseph Muench and Theresa Kraus on February 18, 1889, the first of seven surviving children. His father's ancestors were from Sankt Katharina in the Bohemian Forest near the Bavarian border, what is now Svatá Kateřina in the Czech Republic. His father, a baker, emigrated to Milwaukee at age 18 in 1882. His mother was born in Kemnath in the Upper Palatinate region of Bavaria and emigrated to Milwaukee in 1882 at age 14; Muench's parents married in 1888.

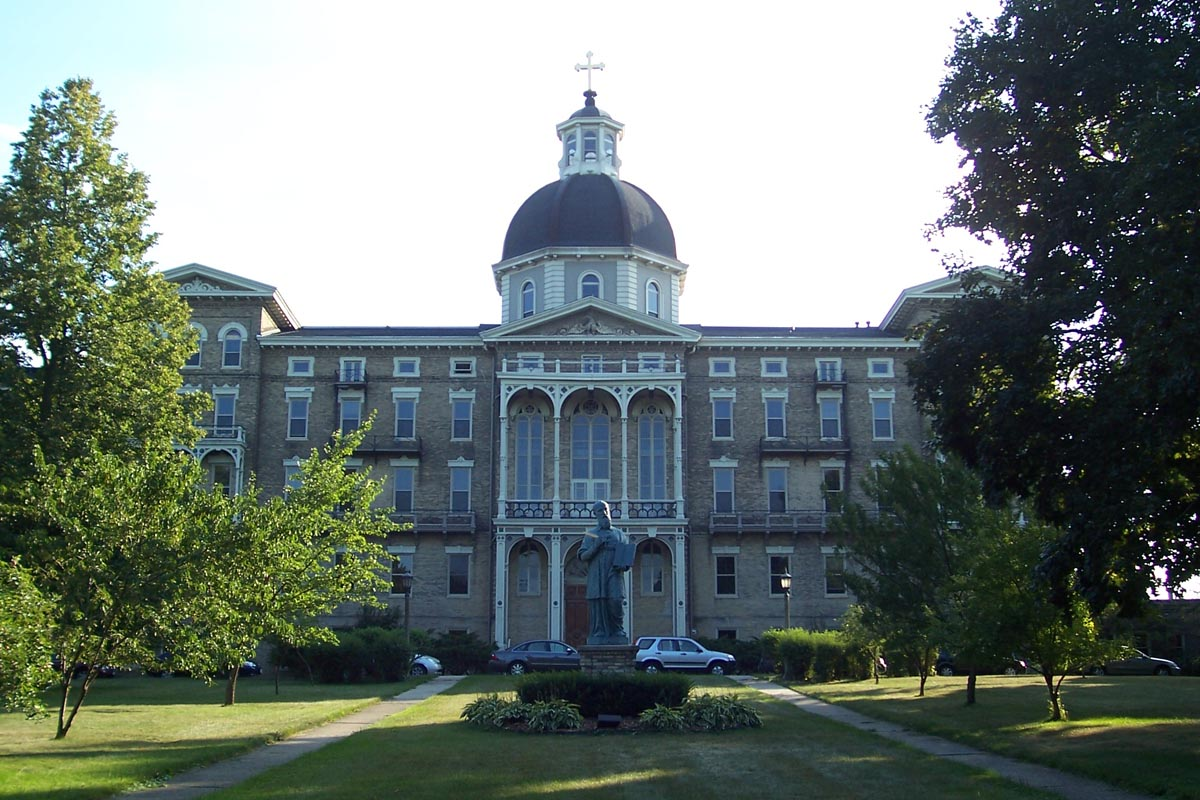
Saint Francis Seminary, St. Francis, Wisconsin (2006)

The Muench family lived on the north side of Milwaukee among other German Catholic immigrants, his parents speaking only German in the home. Muench began his training for the priesthood at age 14, entering Saint Francis Seminary in St. Francis, Wisconsin, in 1904.

== Priesthood ==
Muench was ordained to the priesthood by Archbishop Sebastian Gebhard Messmer on June 8, 1916, for the Archdiocese of Milwaukee. After his ordination, the archdiocese assigned him as an assistant pastor to Saint Michael's Parish in Milwaukee.

He left Milwaukee in 1917 to become the assistant chaplain of Saint Paul's University Chapel at the University of Wisconsin in Madison, Wisconsin, where he obtained a master's degree in economics in 1918.

In 1919, Muench entered the University of Fribourg in Switzerland, earning a doctorate magna cum laude in July 1921 in the social sciences, focusing on theological disciplines of economics, social morality, and social ethics. He was a member of KDStV Catholic German Student Association Teutonia Freiburg, a Catholic student fraternity that was part of the Union of Catholic German Student Fraternities.

The archbishop of Milwaukee granted Muench permission to remain in Europe to study at University of Leuven (Belgium), Cambridge, Oxford, the London School of Economics, the Collège de France, and the Sorbonne. Muench returned to St. Francis Seminary in 1922 as a professor. In 1929, he ceased his teaching duties to become a rector. The Vatican elevated Muench to the rank of monsignor in September 1934.

== Bishop of Fargo (1935–1959) ==
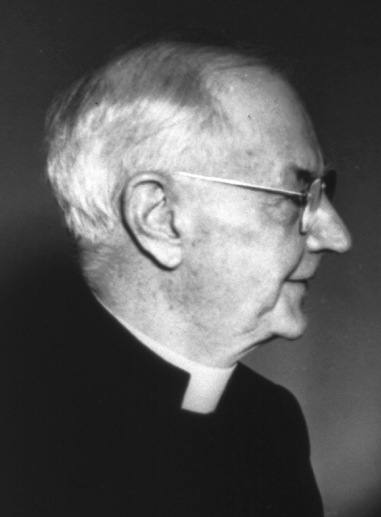
Cardinal Samuel Stritch recommended Muench to Pope Pius XII and President Harry Truman for liaison post in Germany

On August 10, 1935, Pope Pius XI appointed Muench as the third bishop of Fargo; he was consecrated by Cardinal Amleto Giovanni Cicognani at Gesu Church in Milwaukee on October 15, 1935. Muench was installed in Fargo on November 6, 1935.

Muench in 1946 accompanied Archbishop Samuel Stritch to Rome when the latter was created cardinal by Pope Pius XII; Muench purchased the red hat that Stritch received duringthe ceremony. In a meeting with the pope, Stritch recommended Muench for the role of apostolic visitor in post-war Germany, because of his "sympathy" for the "suffering of the German people".

When Muench returned to the United States, he was offered the additional position of liaison between the U.S. post-war occupation authorities in Germany (the Office of Military Government, United States Zone, OMGUS) and the German Catholic Church. This was also on the recommendation of Stritch, after Anthony Strauss, the first choice of the Truman Administration, turned the appointment down.

== Post-war Germany (1946–1951) ==
After the end of World War II in 1945, Pope Pius XII appointed Muench in 1946 as apostolic visitor to the allied-occupied sections of defeated Germany. In Fargo, Auxiliary Bishop Leo Ferdinand Dworschak was elected in 1947 to serve as the apostolic administrator of the Diocese of Fargo in Muench's absence.

From 1946 to 1949, Muench served as military vicar delegate of the United States Armed Forces, and in 1949 was named regent of the nunciature in Germany. Muench also served as "liaison consultant for religious affairs to the military governor", appointed by Secretary of War Robert P. Patterson. The German nunciature had been vacant since the death of Archbishop Cesare Orsenigo in 1946. Muench assumed the de facto role of nuncio before he received the title on March 6, 1951.

According to Barry's biography, Muench focused on three goals in Germany:

- Running the Vatican mission to assist Catholic displaced persons and prisoners of war. This mission was funded by American donations brokered by Muench.
- Maintaining the validity of the Reichskonkordat, a 1933 treaty between the Vatican and Nazi Germany)
- Ensuring the autonomy of German Catholic schools from state control

Historian Michael Phayer views Muench's dual appointment as significant:

"Muench's position was extraordinary. At one and the same time, he was President Truman's Catholic liaison to OMGUS and Pius XII's personal envoy to zonal Germany. Serving two masters, he listened to Rome, not Washington from the moment of his arrival in Germany".

=== One World in Charity ===
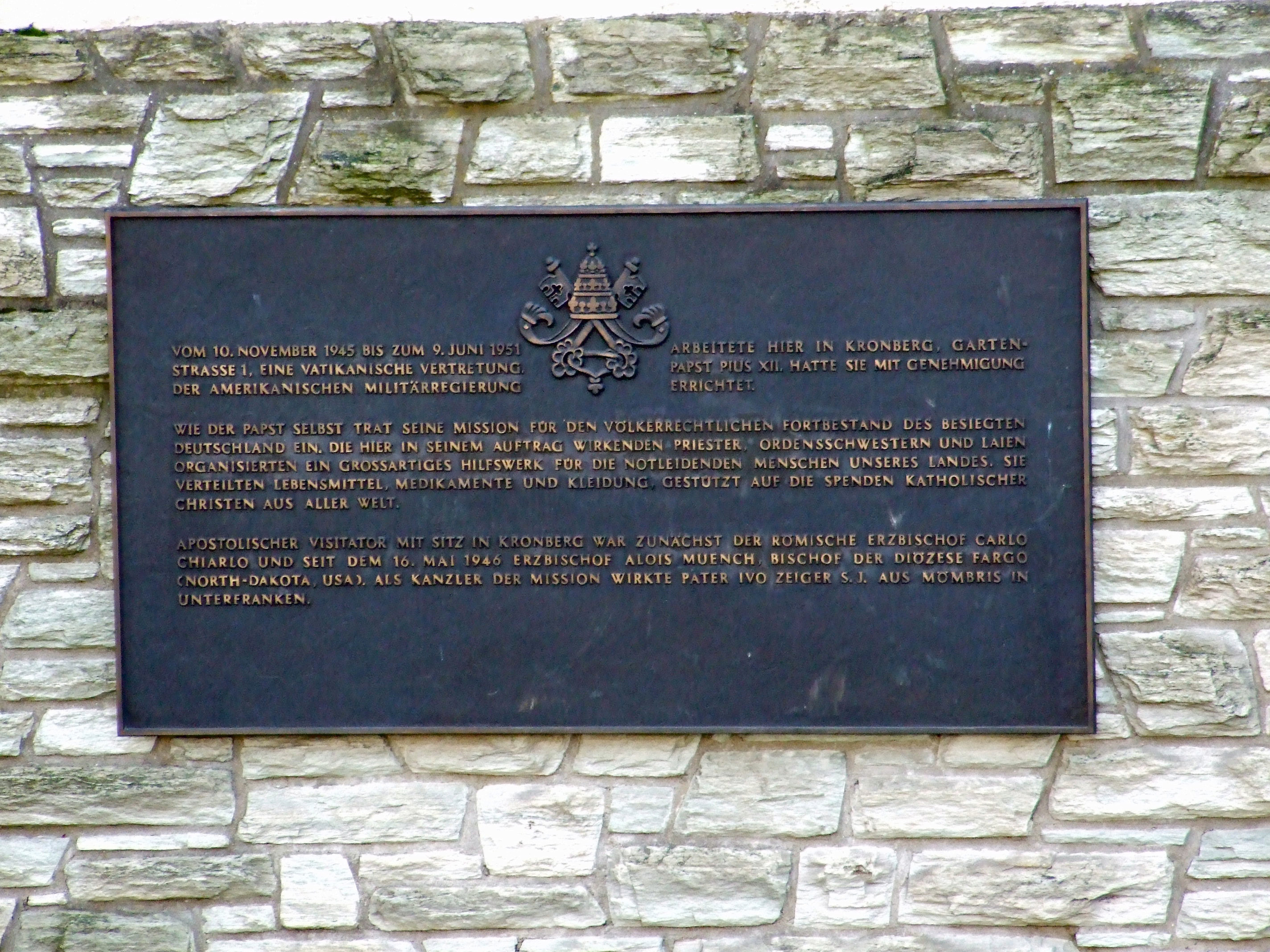
A plaque in Kronberg commemorating Muench's term as apostolic visitor

Muench's pastoral letter One World In Charity was published in installments (in the U.S. first in January 1946, and in occupied Germany one year later). The 10,200 word letter was read from the diocese of Fargo's pulpits weekly on the five Sundays between Shrove Tuesday and Passion Sunday. It was then translated into German and printed first in German language newspapers in the United States. Truncated versions of One World, focusing on Muench's comments about the collective guilt of German Catholics and the equation of the Nazis and the allied occupation authorities began to circulate in Germany in early 1947. It and spread rapidly, due to grassroots distribution (authorized or unauthorized) and quotation in German newspapers.

One World appeared in both religious and secular publications alongside statements denying Germans' complicity in the Holocaust, especially the concept of collective guilt. Muench received several letters from German Catholics commenting on One World; they regarded him as one who understood German "suffering" and believed him to be of German descent.One World referred to the Allied authorities as "other Hitlers in disguise, who would make of [the German] nation a crawling [Bergen-]Belsen. One World argued that responsibility for the Holocaust lay only with a very few war criminals who had "revived the Mosaic idea of an eye for an eye".

According to Brown-Fleming, Muench's sympathies in his writing matched his actions as one of the most active participants in the Vatican's "postwar clemency campaign on behalf of convicted war criminals". In particular, he spoke against what he perceived to be the mistreatment of high-ranking prisoners such as the diplomate Konstantin von Neurath, Admiral Erich Raeder, Admiral Karl Dönitz, politician Walther Funk, politician Baldur von Schirach, architect and Hitler confident Albert Speer, and Deputy Fuhrer Rudolf Hess. Muench wrote that their treatment was "another terrible blotch on our record for decent, humane treatment of war criminals". One World was cited by prison guard Josef Hering and other war criminals in their own writings.

=== Relationship with Jews ===
In at least four instances, Muench became involved in restitution disputes in Germany between Catholic Germans and Jews regarding property seized during the war. In each instance, Muench sided with the German Catholics, contacting highly placed German and American officials on their behalf. Muench wrote in a September 1946 letter that "some of these gents exploit the fact that they were in concentration camps for their own benefit, although some were there because of an unsavory past". In one restitution case, where a distant relative of Muench had been sentenced by a military court to a fine of 2,000 marks and the return of his business to a Polish Jew, Muench wrote "a lot of hardship and injustice comes about because of [restitution resulting from] denazification".

Muench was also an opponent of interreligious dialogue efforts that included Jews, opposing the organization of chapters of the National Conference of Christians and Jews (NCCJ) and the International Conference of Christians and Jews (ICCJ), among others, in occupied Germany. In a 1948 letter to Carl Zietlow, a Minnesotan Protestant pastor of the NCCJ, Muench described the organization as unneeded because: "regarding anti-Semitism" he had "found very little of it". Historian Paul Weindling has described Muench as having "made efforts to downplay war crimes by distrusting Holocaust survivors as exaggerating Nazi crimes", part of a broader worldview that stated that "Germans were victims: Jews, Slavs and communists were exaggerating crimes against them to extricate resources".

According to Phayer, for Muench as well as Pius XII, the "priority was not the survivors of the Holocaust, but the situation of the German Catholic refugees in Eastern Europe who had been expelled from their home nations at the end of the war. Muench felt that their suffering was comparable to that of the Jews during the Holocaust".

=== Clemency for war crimes ===
Along with other German and American clerics, such as Johann Neuhausler, auxiliary bishop of Munich, Cardinal Josef Frings of Cologne, Muench was "in close contact with occupation authorities, other religious leaders, and the convicted war criminals themselves" regarding the campaign for clemency for Nazi war criminals.

In February 1950, Pius XII instructed Muench to write a letter in support of clemency for some convicted German war criminals to General Thomas Hardy, the head of the U.S. Army European Command, who had the final word on all clemency decisions; with his new appointment as papal regent, Muench was to speak as a direct representative of the pope. In his diary, Muench made it clear that he viewed as "questionable" the sentences of war criminals who had not been directly involved in medical experimentation or other extreme acts at concentration camps or the deportation of people for slave labor. Prior to this, Muench had frequently become involved in individual clemency cases, but took care not to attract undue attention or publicity to the Vatican. As the Vatican urged Muench to press harder against the U.S. authorities, Muench wrote to Undersecretary Montini (future Pope Paul VI) warning him that Rome was on "dangerously thin ice". According to Phayer, it was Muench's discretion that "saved the Vatican from becoming publicly associated with former Nazis". Muench wrote: "I have not dared to advise the Holy See to intervene, especially if such intervention would eventually become public".

Muench often preferred to work behind the scenes; for example, a letter from one of Muench's secretaries provided Reverend Franz Lovenstein the contact information he had requested "with the understanding, of course, that you are not to use his name in connection with any letters or briefs that will be sent to those gentlemen". For example, in the case of Hans Eisele, the former SS doctor convicted of experimentation on prisoners, there is some evidence that Muench's intervention with General Clay in the summer of 1948 resulted in the commutation of Eisele's execution and his eventual release in 1952.

== Nunciature (1951–1959) ==
Muench's role as apostolic visitor was upgraded to nuncio when the Allied High Commission permitted the Federal Republic of Germany (West Germany) to form an independent foreign affairs ministry in March 1951. On March 9, 1951, Pope Pius XII appointed Muench as papal nuncio to Germany with the title of archbishop. Muench viewed it as no small honor to hold the nunciature formerly occupied by Pius XII himself. On March 12the, Pius XII moved the nunciature from Eichstätt to Bad Godesberg in West Germany outside of Bonn. By April 4, 1951, Muench was named dean of the German diplomatic corps, the first diplomat accredited by West Germany.

== Relationship with Pius XII ==
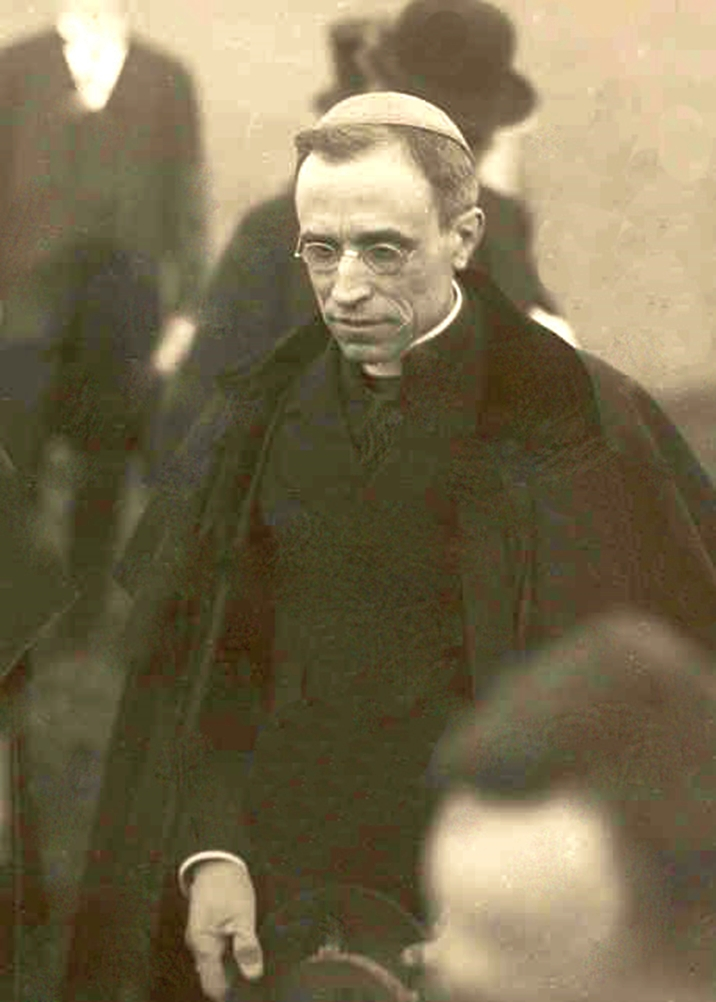
Muench met and corresponded frequently with Pope Pius XII, his predecessor as nuncio.

There is much evidence of genuine camaraderie between Pius XII and Muench. He met Eugenio Pacelli (the future pope) for the first time while Pacelli was nuncio to Bavaria, when Muench visited Munich as a student representative of the Catholic Central Verein of America (CCVA).

As pope, Pius XII received Muench in several audiences, and after their second audience on July 12, 1946, the two always conversed in German. Muench also wrote many reports on the events in Germany directly to Pius XII between 1946 and 1958, and there is some evidence that Pius XII read many of them personally, even in 1953 when his health began to deteriorate. The reports spoke not only of the immediate, material needs of German Catholics, but also of the spread of communism, a fear shared by Muench and Pius XII, and the subject of another 1954 audience between the two.

Muench and Pius XII met in February 1947 and in the fall of 1948 and 1949; although initially Muench (in his letters to others) expressed satisfaction with Pius XII's grasp of the situation in Germany, he later stated that the pope was too reliant on his own, earlier experiences in Germany and did not "fully grasp" the implications of the occupation and increasing secularization. Muench wrote that Pius XII was continuing to interpret the events unfolding in Germany "according to this or that phrase of the Concordat".

In the 1953 dedication of the North American College in Rome, Pius XII stopped as he passed by Muench, expressed his gratitude that Muench could join him in Rome, and added "don't forget to see me before you leave". Muench was, according to Reverend Gerald Weber (in attendance), the only one of the many assembled bishops and cardinals whom Pius XII stopped and talked to.

Muench mourned the death of Pius XII in October 1958, telling friends that the pope "treated him with the affection and love of a father to his son".

The correspondence between Muench and Pius XII focused almost exclusively on the various opinions shared by the two men, often with great levity, but rarely touched on the issues of anti-Semitism, the Holocaust, the wartime relationship between the church and Nazi Germany, and the situation of the postwar Jewry. According to Brown-Fleming, in one private audience between the two in May 1957 Pius XII told Muench a joke about Hitler dying, going to Heaven, and meeting the prophet Moses, who forgives Hitler; Hitler then asks Moses if he set fire to the burning bush himself, a tongue-in-cheek reference to the 1933 Reichstag fire. The joke apparently elicited a "big laugh" from Pius XII.

== Cardinalate and death ==
Muench was elevated to cardinal on December 14, 1959, by Pope John XXIII. Muench resigned as bishop of Fargo on December 9, 1959, just before he became cardinal. He died in Rome on February 15, 1962, and was buried in Fargo.

== Papers ==
=== Origins ===
Muench's papers from course of his work in Germany are well preserved. This makes them one of a very few collections of papers from German, American, or Vatican Catholic dignitaries of that time period that are "fully accessible to historians". According to Muench's biographer, Reverend Colman Barry, Muench took his papers with him to Rome when he retired as nuncio in December 1959 and the papers were returned to the diocesan archives in 1962 after his death. Altogether, the papers weigh over 2,500 pounds, including those Muench transferred directly from Bad Godesberg to Fargo prior to moving to Rome.

As early as June 1956, Muench tasked his secretary, Reverend Gerard Weber, with the talk of sending his files, mostly composed of his personal correspondences, back to Fargo; Muench further directed four German nuns of the Saint Lioba convent in Freiburg/Breisgau to organize his German language correspondence. He continued sending records to Fargo until December 1959; in December 1960 he wrote a letter thanking an American friend bringing his personal diplomatic archives to the United States "without custom difficulties". After Muench died on February 15, 1962, the papers were found by Sister Ilga Braun, secretary to the Bonn nunciature since 1951, who was invited by his successor as Bishop of Fargo, Leo Dworschak to organize the papers, which she did until 1963.

The papers were presented to the Catholic University of America in September 1972 by Bishop Justin Albert Driscoll, and indexed by 1976.

=== Contents ===
Among the papers are tens of thousands of letters (and Muench's replies) from German Catholics dated from 1946 to 1959, many from convicted Catholic war criminals seeking Muench's assistance in revising their denazification sentence, having their imprisonment commuted, or seeking emigration to the United States. Muench's correspondence was vast, numbering approximately 15,000 letters in 1956 alone; but of those, only 300 addressed the Holocaust explicitly.

In addition, Muench received approximately 100 letters from U.S. Catholics and military government officials speaking frankly on taboo topics, such as anti-Semitism, the Holocaust, and its survivors. For example, a 1947 letter from a German Catholic alleged that U.S. generals such as Lucius D. Clay and Walter Muller were Jews, that US President Franklin D. Roosevelt had been assassinated by Jews, and other Jewish conspiracy theories. Another letter from a Catholic US Army major stated that enlisted Jews sought promotions into positions where they could "control thought".

=== Diary ===
Muench kept a diary, which often recorded his recollections of conversations with important post-war leaders. For example, Muench wrote in his diary that former US President Herbert Hoover had confided in Muench his belief that "no emigrés who were not citizens for at least twenty years should be permitted to shape and execute policies in Germany".

He also reserved for his diary his description of Jewish Germans who had survived the war and resettled in the United States as "alien" and "recent" Americans, disloyal citizens, "in control" of American post-war policy in Germany, and harsh "avengers" against the Germans. For example, when Muench encountered difficulty in 1946 in easing travel restrictions on members of the clergy, he wrote in his diary that the problem was due to "Jews in control [of the] Public Safety [division]". Similarly, Muench referred to Franz Cueppers, a Frankfurt banker convicted of conducting illegal foreign exchange as a "victim of Jewish lawyers".

A recurring point of interest for Muench were what he referred to as "Thirty-Niners": Jews who had fled Germany in 1933 or 1934, received United States citizenship in 1939, and then enlisted in the U.S. Armed Forces—Muench believed—"to wreak their vengeance in every way possible on the defeated foe". Muench's writings often characterized Jews generally, and Jewish displaced persons specifically, to be "greedy, willfully destructive, sexual predators, thieves, and anarchists involved in leftist activities".

== Secondary sources ==
=== Barry's biography ===
Muench commissioned Reverend Coleman Barry—whom he had met in Munich in 1953—to write his biography in 1961. Muench was a long-time benefactor of Barry, ever since he had reviewed Barry's first book, The Catholic Church and the German Americans for the Catholic Historical Review.

Barry interviewed Muench extensively in Fargo in the summer of 1961 and thereafter interviewed his family, friends, colleagues, and acquaintances in Milwaukee, Fargo, Germany, and Rome. Barry published American Nuncio; Cardinal Aloisius Muensch in 1969 and it remains the only biography of Muench.

Barry's biography does not cover the letters between Muench, American Catholics, occupation authorities, and Vatican officials; nor does it address Muench's views of German guilt and collective responsibility for the Holocaust in much depth.

Barry's biography was reviewed by the Journal of Ecumenical Studies and Church History as well as several Catholic journals and papers, which leveled very little criticism of the work, with the exception of the Journal of Ecumenical Studies. The reviewer, Prof. Franklin Littell of Temple University, argued that the work lacked objectivity.

=== Brown-Fleming's monograph ===
Suzanne Brown-Fleming, a fellow at the United States Holocaust Memorial Museum's Center for Advanced Holocaust Studies, published her monograph of the Muench papers in 2006: The Holocaust and Catholic Conscience: Cardinal Aloisius Muench and the Guilt Question in Germany. Dr. Brown-Fleming holds a Ph.D. in Modern German History form the University of Maryland, College Park.

The monograph has received positive reviews. Prof. Mark Edward Ruff of Saint Louis University calls the work "concise and clearly written", her use of primary sources "often convincing and damning", states Brown-Fleming "deserves kudos for bringing the work and values of Muench, a hitherto neglected figure, to the public eye". Prof. Michael Ott of Grand Valley State University calls the work a "critical contribution to the growing research on the question of the Roman Catholic Church's policies and actions with regard to the Holocaust during World War II". Prof. Kevin Spicer of Stonehill College calls the work an "insightful and well-researched examination".

Although Prof. John Conway of the University of British Columbia praises her use of the Muench papers, he notes that "her book suffers from the inaccessibility of the Vatican's records, since the papers for the reign of Pius XII are still-regrettably-closed".

== Notes ==
Catholic Church titles
Preceded by James O'Reilly	Bishop of Fargo; 1935–1959	Succeeded by Leo Ferdinand Dworschak
