= Belle Creek, Minnesota =

Unincorporated community in Minnesota, United States

Belle Creek
- Unincorporated community
- Location within Minnesota Location within the United States
- Coordinates: 44°26′18″N 92°46′15″W
- Country: United States
- State: Minnesota
- County: Goodhue
- Township: Belle Creek
- Elevation: 961 ft (293 m)
- Time zone: UTC-6 (Central (CST))
  - Summer (DST): UTC-5 (CDT)
- ZIP code: 55027
- Area code: 651
- GNIS feature ID: 654596

Belle Creek is an unincorporated community in Belle Creek Township, Goodhue County, Minnesota, United States.

The community is located at the junction of County 8 Boulevard and 352nd Street. Belle Creek flows through the community.

Nearby places include Goodhue, Cannon Falls, White Rock, Ryan, Wastedo, and Hader.

Belle Creek is located within ZIP code 55027 based in Goodhue.

Walter P. Wolfe (1886-1976), Minnesota lawyer and state senator, was born in Belle Creek.
