= John Shanley (bishop) =

American prelate

His Excellency, The Right Reverend John Shanley
- Bishop of Fargo
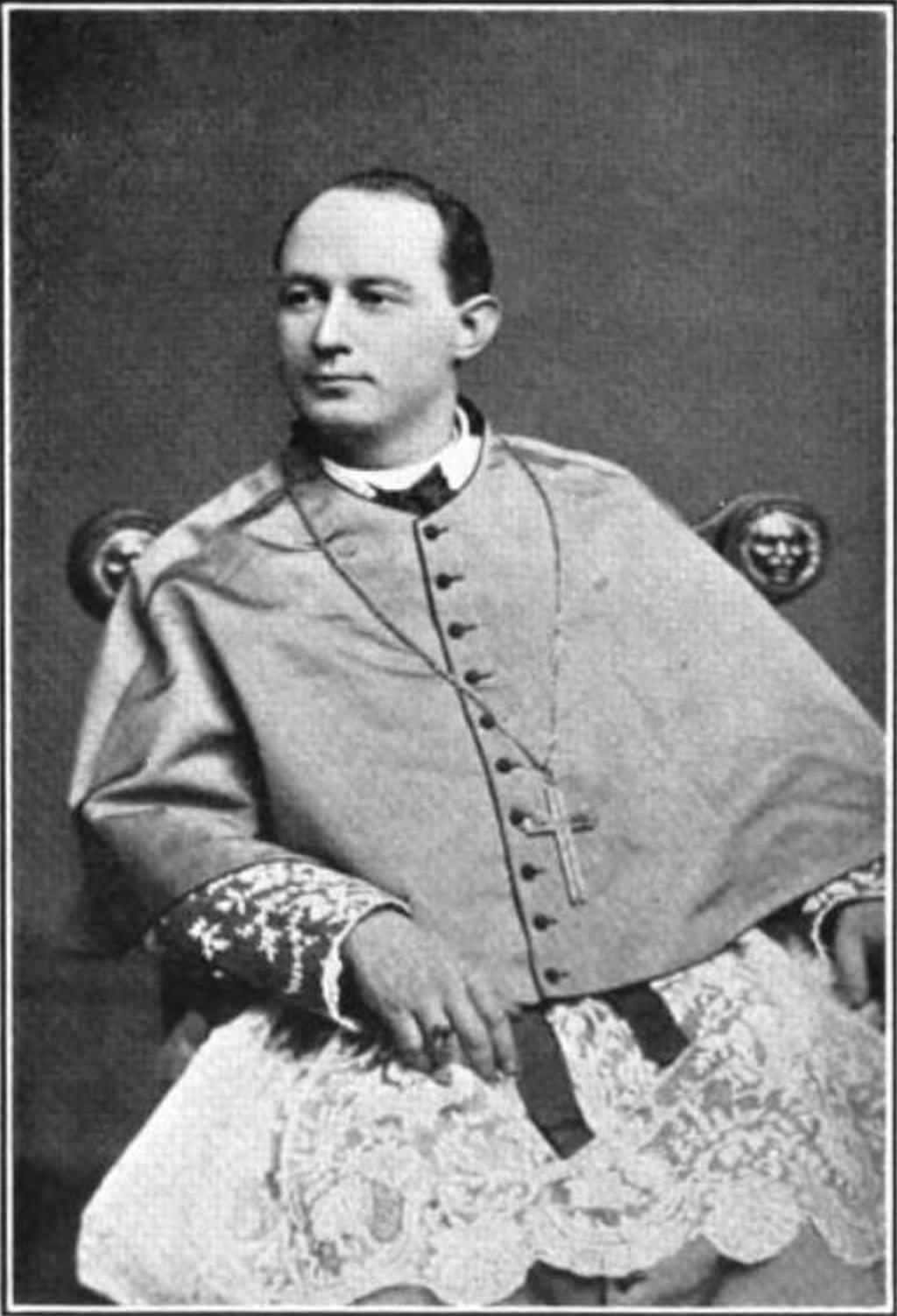
- Church: Roman Catholic Church
- See: Fargo
- In office: December 27, 1889 – July 16, 1909
- Predecessor: none
- Successor: James O'Reilly
- Previous post: Bishop of Jamestown

Orders
- Ordination: May 30, 1874 by Costantino Patrizi Naro
- Consecration: December 27, 1889 by John Ireland

Personal details
- Born: January 4, 1852 Albion, New York, US
- Died: July 16, 1909 (aged 57) Fargo, North Dakota, US
- Education: St. John's College; College of Propaganda

John Shanley (January 4, 1852 – July 16, 1909) was an American prelate of the Roman Catholic Church. He served as bishop of the Diocese of Jamestown in North Dakota, starting in 1889. When the Vatican renamed it as the Diocese of Fargo in 1897, he continued to serve as bishop until his death in 1909.

== Biography ==
=== Early life ===
John Shanley was born on January 4, 1852, in Albion, New York, the youngest son of John and Nancy (née McClean) Shanley. At age five, his family moved to Faribault, Minnesota, and soon afterward to St. Paul. Shanley received his early education from frontier priests who visited St. Paul, while serving as an altar boy at St. Paul Cathedral from 1858 to 1867.

Shanley then attended St. John's College in Collegeville, Minnesota, where was trained in the classics and graduated in 1869. Bishop Thomas Grace then sent him to the College of Propaganda in Rome; Shanley made the journey with Reverend John Ireland, the future archbishop of the Archdiocese of St. Paul and Minneapolis.

=== Priesthood ===
While in Rome, Shanley was ordained to the priesthood by Cardinal Costantino Naro on May 30, 1874. At age 22, he was below the age requirement for ordination but was granted a dispensation on account of his frail health. Upon his return to Minnesota in 1882, Shanley became an assistant pastor at St. Paul Cathedral under Ireland. Ireland took Shanley under his wing and gave him many responsibilities in the church. Shanley succeeded Ireland as pastor of the Cathedral parish in 1884. He also served as secretary of the archdiocese and editor of the weekly Northwestern Chronicle.

Shanley made it a priority to serve minorities and the destitute; he conducted segregated services for African-American Catholics in the basement of the cathedral.

=== Bishop of Jamestown ===
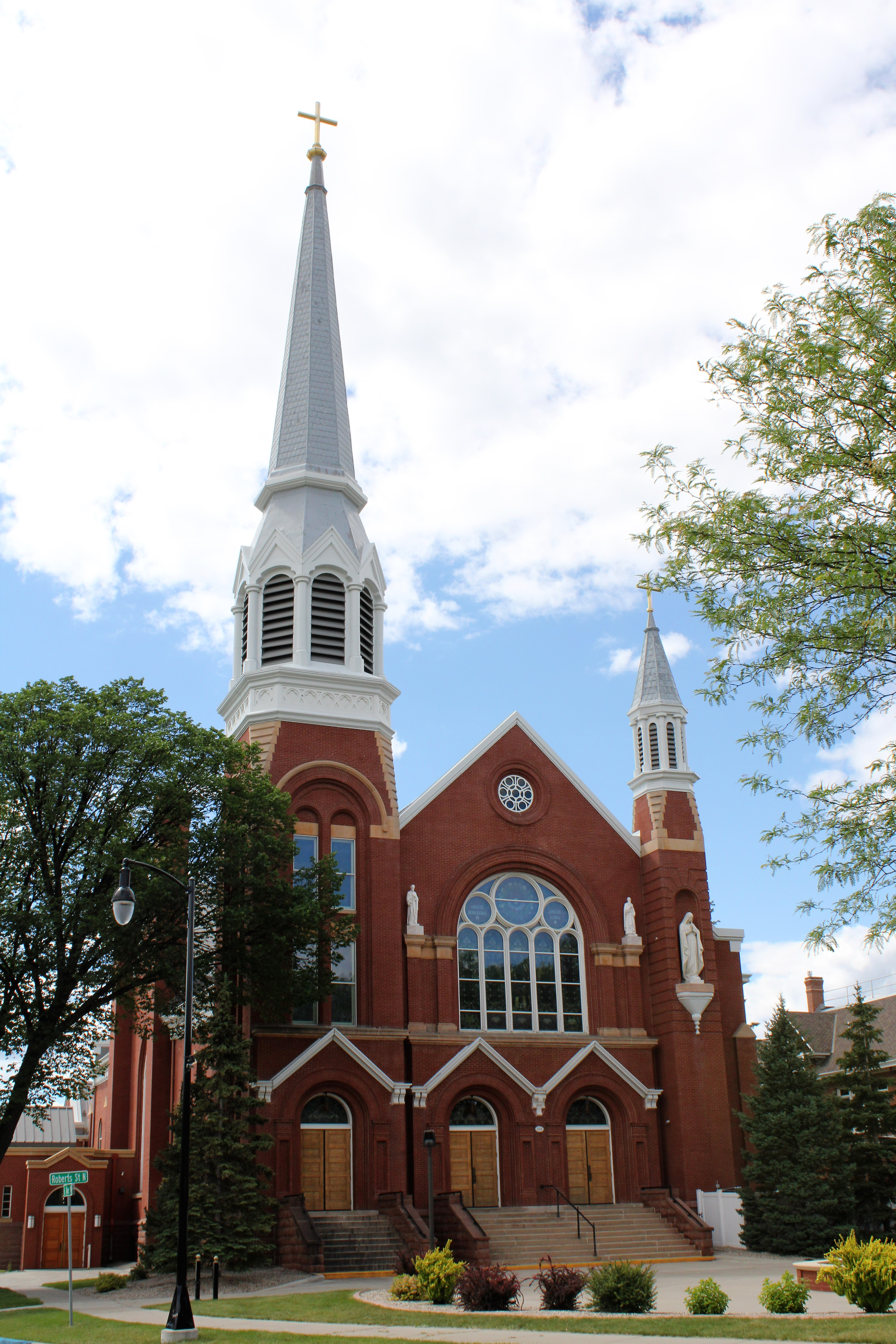
Cathedral of Saint Mary, Fargo, North Dakota (2021)

On November 15, 1889, Shanley was appointed the first bishop of the newly erected Diocese of Jamestown in North Dakota by Pope Leo XIII. He received his episcopal consecration on December 27, 1889, at the Cathedral of Saint Paul, from then Archbishop Ireland, with Bishops Grace and Martin Marty serving as co-consecrators. Shanley established St. John's Academy at Jamestown, under the charge of the Sisters of St. Joseph, in 1890.

Shanley found running the diocese from Jamestown difficult and moved to Fargo in 1891. While Shanley resided in Jamestown, St. James Church was designated the diocesan cathedral, but when he moved the see to Fargo. As the church building in Fargo proved inadequate, Shanley purchased property in Fargo for a new cathedral and had plans drawn up. The basement was completed when a fire destroyed most of downtown Fargo in 1893. Shanley donated a large portion of the funds that he had personally raised for the new cathedral to reconstruct the city after the fire. Construction on the cathedral was, therefore, delayed. The Cathedral of Saint Mary was completed and it was dedicated on May 30, 1899.

In 1891, Shanley wrote the Fargo Argus defending Native Americans living on the Turtle Mountain Indian Reservation. He denounced the actions taken by local Indian agents and highlighted positive aspects of Native American culture. He hosted the convention of Catholic Laymen in 1896.

==== Bishop of Fargo ====
On April 6, 1897, the name of the diocese was changed to the Diocese of Fargo. At the beginning of his tenure, there were 60 churches, 33 priests, 14 schools and one hospital in the diocese; by the time of his death, there 106 priests, 225 churches, six academies, 34 schools and four hospitals.

Shanley took great interest in the development of the material interests of Fargo and the state, making large subscriptions to whatever contributed to the advancement of the state or of its people. He went to Washington, D.C., in 1906 to protest the legalization of divorce and established Total Abstinence Societies in the diocese.

=== Death and legacy ===
John Shanley died in his sleep on July 16, 1909, at Fargo, aged 57.

== See also ==
- McCumber Agreement
- Shanley High School

Catholic Church titles
Preceded by none	Bishop of Fargo; 1889–1909	Succeeded by James O'Reilly
