= John Folda =

American Catholic prelate (born 1961)

His Excellency, The Most Reverend John Folda
- Bishop of Fargo
- Province: Saint Paul and Minneapolis
- Diocese: Fargo
- Appointed: April 8, 2013
- Installed: June 19, 2013
- Predecessor: Samuel J. Aquila

Orders
- Ordination: May 27, 1989 by Glennon Patrick Flavin
- Consecration: June 19, 2013 by John Clayton Nienstedt, Samuel J. Aquila, and James D. Conley

Personal details
- Born: August 8, 1961 (age 64) Omaha, Nebraska US
- Denomination: Roman Catholic
- Education: University of Nebraska; St. Charles Borromeo Seminary; Pontifical University of Saint Thomas Aquinas
- Motto: Verbum caro factum est (Latin for 'Word was made flesh')

Styles of John Folda
- Reference style: His Excellency; The Most Reverend
- Spoken style: Your Excellency
- Religious style: Bishop

John Thomas Folda (born August 8, 1961) is an American Catholic prelate who serves as Bishop of Fargo in North Dakota.

== Biography ==
=== Early life ===
John Thomas Folda was born on August 8, 1961, in Omaha, Nebraska to James and Mabel Folda. He attended St. Thomas More Elementary School and then went to Archbishop Ryan High School in Omaha. Following his high school graduation in 1979, Folda entered the University of Nebraska (UNL) in Lincoln, Nebraska, where he studied architecture and electrical engineering. He graduated from UNL in 1983.

Having decided to become a priest, Folda in 1983 went to Wynnewood, Pennsylvania, to attend St. Charles Borromeo Seminary. He received a Bachelor of Arts degree in philosophy in 1985, a Master of Divinity degree in 1988, and a Master of Arts degree in theology.

=== Priesthood ===
Folda was ordained a priest at the Cathedral of the Risen Christ in Lincoln by Bishop Glennon Flavin for the Diocese of Lincoln on May 27, 1989. After his 1989 ordination, the diocese assigned Folda as an assistant pastor at the Cathedral of the Risen Christ Parish and a religion teacher at St. Pius X High School in Lincoln.

In 1991, Folda traveled to Rome to study at the Pontifical University of Saint Thomas Aquinas. He received a Licentiate in Sacred Theology in 1993. After returning to Nebraska in 1993, he was named pastor of St. Paulinus Parish in Syracuse and Holy Trinity Parish in Avoca. Folda also served as a teacher and counselor at Lourdes Central Catholic High School in Nebraska City.

Beginning in 1995, Folda served as pastor of St. Leo Parish in Palmyra and St. Martin Parish in Douglas. Folda was named the diocesan director of religious education and co-vicar for religious education in 1997. The following year, he was named the spiritual director at St. Gregory the Great Seminary in Seward and rector in 1998. Pope Benedict XVI named Folda a chaplain of his holiness, with the title "monsignor" in 2007.

=== Bishop of Fargo ===
Pope Francis named Folda as bishop of Fargo on April 8, 2013. He was consecrated on June 19, 2013, at the Cathedral of St. Mary in Fargo, North Dakota. Archbishop John Nienstedt was the principal consecrator. Archbishop Samuel Aquila and Bishop James D. Conley acted as the co-consecrators.

On July 2, 2021, Folda announced that Bishop James Sullivan, a former bishop of Fargo, had been added to a list of clerics with credible accusations of sexual abuse of minors. Sullivan, who died in 2006, had been accused of abusing two boys in Lansing, Michigan, when he was a priest. The diocese then renamed Sullivan Middle School as Sacred Heart Middle School.

== See also ==
- Catholic Church hierarchy
- Catholic Church in the United States
- Historical list of the Catholic bishops of the United States
- List of Catholic bishops of the United States
- Lists of patriarchs, archbishops, and bishops

== Episcopal succession ==
Catholic Church titles
Preceded by Samuel J. Aquila	Bishop of Fargo; 2013–present	Incumbent
