= James O'Reilly (bishop) =

Irish-born prelate

His Eminence, The Most Reverend James O'Reilly
- Bishop of Fargo
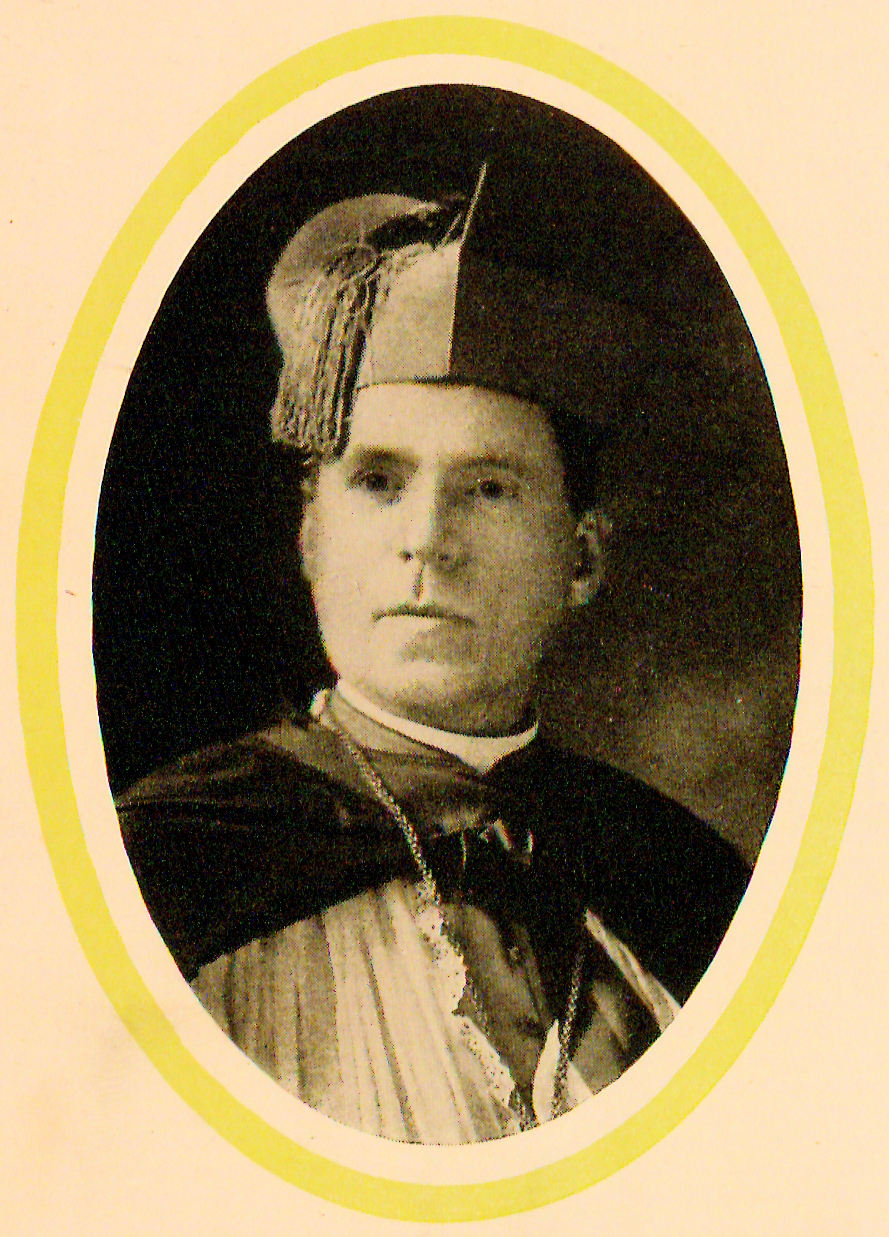
- Church: Roman Catholic Church
- See: Diocese of Fargo
- In office: May 19, 1910 to December 19, 1934
- Predecessor: John Shanley
- Successor: Aloisius Joseph Muench

Orders
- Ordination: June 24, 1882 by Bartholomew Woodlock
- Consecration: May 19, 1910 by Archbishop John Ireland

Personal details
- Born: October 10, 1855 County Cavan, Ireland
- Died: December 19, 1934 (aged 79) Fargo, North Dakota, US
- Education: All Hallows College

James O'Reilly (October 10, 1855—December 19, 1934) was an Irish-born prelate of the Roman Catholic Church. He served as the second bishop of the Diocese of Fargo from 1910 until his death in 1934.

== Biography ==
=== Early life ===
James O'Reilly was born in Lisgrea, County Cavan Ireland on October 10, 1855. He was educated at All Hallows College in Dublin.

O'Reilly was ordained to the priesthood in Dublin by Bishop Bartholomew Woodlock on June 24, 1882, for the Archdiocese of St. Paul. After his ordination, he served as pastor in parishes in Belle Creek, Lake City and Stillwater, Minnesota. In 1886, O'Reilly was appointed pastor of St. Anthony of Padua Parish in Minneapolis.

=== Bishop of Fargo ===
On December 18, 1909, O'Reilly was appointed the second bishop of Fargo by Pope Pius X. He received his episcopal consecration at Saint Paul Seminary in St. Paul, Minnesota, on May 19, 1910, from Archbishop John Ireland, with Bishops James McGolrick and James Trobec serving as co-consecrators.

James O'Reilly died in Fargo on December 19, 1934, at age 79.

Catholic Church titles
Preceded by John Shanley	Bishop of Fargo; 1910–1934	Succeeded by Aloisius Joseph Muench
