= Leo Ferdinand Dworschak =

American Catholic bishop (1900–1976)

His Excellency, The Most Reverend Leo Ferdinand Dworschak
- Bishop of Fargo; Titular Bishop of Tium; Titular Bishop of Meta
- Church: Roman Catholic Church
- See: Diocese of Fargo
- In office: February 23, 1960 to September 8, 1970
- Predecessor: Aloisius Joseph Muench
- Successor: Justin Albert Driscoll
- Other posts: Coadjutor Bishop of Rapid City; 1946 to 1947; Auxiliary Bishop of Fargo; 1947 to 1960

Orders
- Ordination: May 29, 1926 by Joseph Francis Busch
- Consecration: August 22, 1946 by Amleto Giovanni Cicognani

Personal details
- Born: April 6, 1900 Independence, Wisconsin, US
- Died: November 5, 1976 (aged 76) Fargo, North Dakota, US
- Motto: Vivamus per Christum (We live through Christ)

Styles of Leo Ferdinand Dworschak'
- Reference style: His Excellency; The Most Reverend
- Spoken style: Your Excellency
- Religious style: Bishop

Leo Ferdinand Dworschak (April 6, 1900 – November 5, 1976) was an American prelate of the Roman Catholic Church. He served as the fourth bishop of the Diocese of Fargo in North Dakota from 1960 to 1970. He previously served as auxiliary bishop of the same diocese from 1947 to 1960 and as coadjutor bishop of the Diocese of Rapid City in South Dakota from 1946 to 1947.

== Biography ==
Leo Dworschak was born on April 6, 1900, in Independence, Wisconsin. His father was a Czech immigrant from around Neuhaus in what was then Austria-Hungary. Leo Dworschak was ordained to the priesthood in Collegeville, Minnesota, for the Diocese of Fargo on May 29, 1926, by Bishop Joseph Francis Busch.

=== Coadjutor Bishop of Rapid City ===
Coat of arms as auxiliary bishop and as coadjutor bishop

On June 22, 1946, Pope Pius XII appointed Dworschak as titular bishop of Tium and coadjutor bishop of the Diocese of Rapid City. He was consecrated bishop on August 22, 1946 at the Cathedral of Saint Mary in Fargo by Cardinal Amleto Giovanni Cicognani.

=== Auxiliary Bishop and Bishop of Fargo ===
On April 10, 1947, Pope Pius XII appointed Dworschak as the auxiliary bishop of the Fargo Diocese, where he was serving apostolic administrator, while Bishop Aloisius Muench was the apostolic visitor in Germany. On February 23, 1960, Pope John XXIII appointed Dworschak the fourth bishop of the Diocese of Fargo.

Pope Paul VI accepted Dworschak's retirement as bishop of Fargo on September 8, 1970 and named him as titular bishop of Meta. Leo Dworschak died in Fargo on November 5, 1976, at age 76.

Catholic Church titles
Preceded by Aloisius Joseph Muench	Bishop of Fargo; 1960–1970	Succeeded by Justin Albert Driscoll
