= Walter P. Wolfe =

American lawyer and politician

Walter P. Wolfe (December 11, 1886 – April 26, 1966) was an American lawyer and politician.

Wolfe was born on a farm in Belle Creek, Goodhue County, Minnesota. He went to the Chicago, Illinois public schools and also went to the Chicago Law School. Wolfe graduated from the William Mitchell College of Law (formerly St. Paul College of Law) in Saint Paul, Minnesota in 1914. He lived in Minneapolis, Minnesota with his wife. Wolfe served in the Minnesota Senate from 1931 to 1942. He died in Hennepin County, Minnesota.
