= Samuel J. Aquila =

American Catholic prelate (born 1950)

His Excellency, The Most Reverend Samuel J. Aquila
- Metropolitan Archbishop Emeritus of Denver
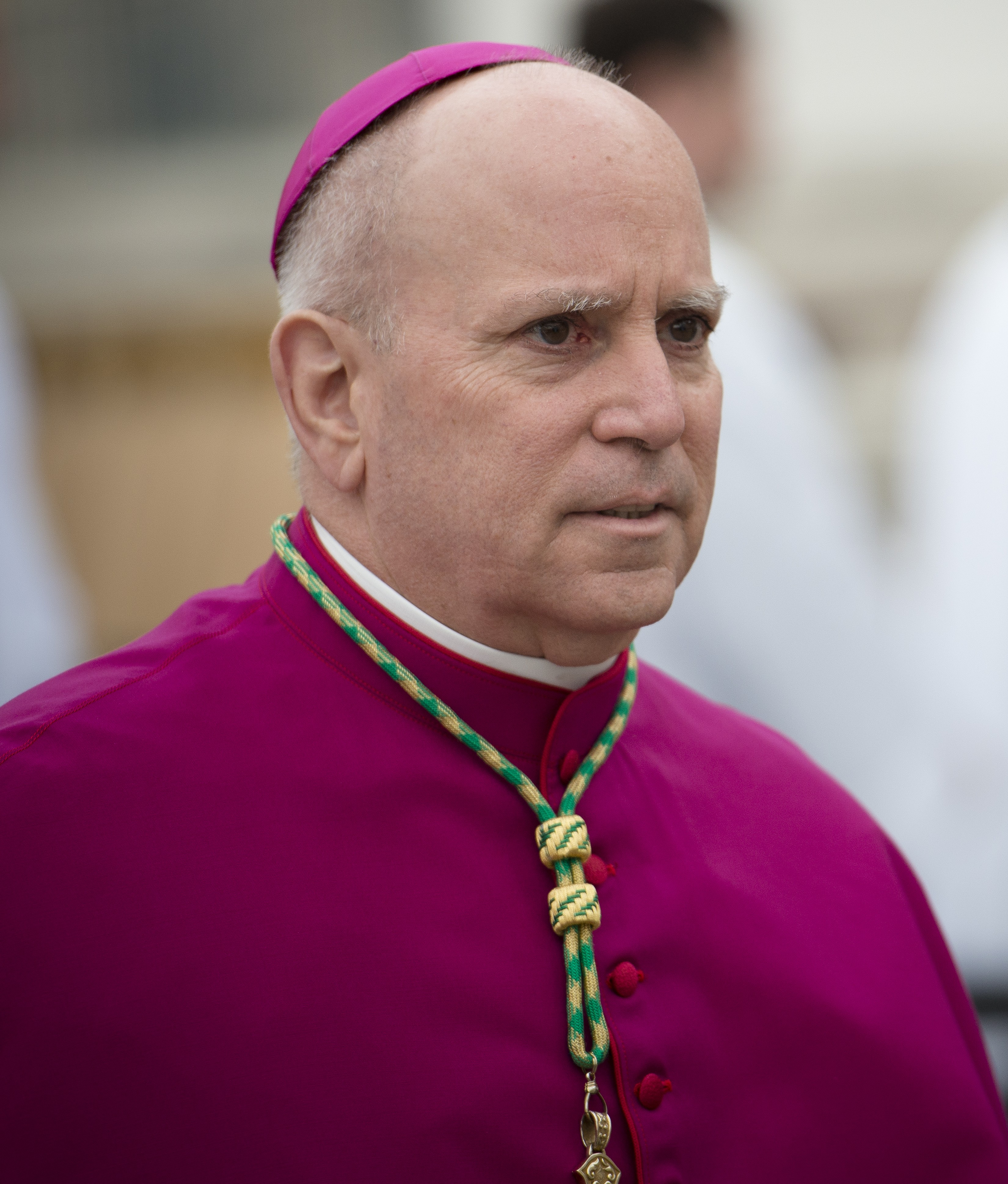
- Aquila in 2014
- Archdiocese: Denver
- Appointed: May 29, 2012
- Installed: July 18, 2012
- Retired: February 7, 2026
- Predecessor: Charles Chaput
- Successor: James Golka
- Previous posts: Bishop of Fargo (2002–2012); Coadjutor Bishop of Fargo (2001–2002)

Orders
- Ordination: June 5, 1976 by James Vincent Casey
- Consecration: August 24, 2001 by Harry Joseph Flynn, James Stephen Sullivan, and Charles J. Chaput

Personal details
- Born: September 24, 1950 (age 76) Burbank, California, US
- Motto: Quodcumque dixerit facite (Latin for 'Do whatever He says') — John 2:5
- Styles
- Reference style: His Excellency; The Most Reverend
- Spoken style: Your Excellency
- Religious style: Archbishop

Ordination history
History
Episcopal consecration
- Consecrated by: Harry Joseph Flynn
Episcopal succession
Bishops consecrated by Samuel J. Aquila as principal consecrator
- Stephen Jay Berg: February 27, 2014
- Jorge Rodríguez-Novelo: November 4, 2016
- Steven Biegler: June 5, 2017
- James R. Golka: June 29, 2021

Samuel Joseph Aquila (/əkwiːlə/; born September 24, 1950) is an American Catholic prelate who served as archbishop of Denver in Colorado from 2012 to 2026. He was bishop of Fargo from 2002 to 2012. He is on the board of directors for the Fellowship of Catholic University Students.

== Biography ==
=== Early life ===
Aquila was born on September 24, 1950, in Burbank, California. He was ordained a priest of the Archdiocese of Denver at the Cathedral Basilica of the Immaculate Conception in Denver by Archbishop James Casey on June 5, 1976.

In 1999, Archbishop Charles Chaput appointed Aquila as rector of the new St. John Vianney Seminary in Denver. He was also named chief executive officer of the Our Lady of the New Advent Theological Institute at the seminary. In 2000, Pope John Paul II named Aquila as an Honorary Prelate (Monsignor).

=== Coadjutor bishop and bishop of Fargo ===
On May 29, 2001, John Paul appointed Aquila coadjutor bishop of Fargo. Aquila received his episcopal consecration at Saint Mary Cathedral in Fargo on August 24, 2001, from Archbishop Harry Flynn. Aquila became bishop of Fargo upon the resignation of Bishop James Sullivan on March 18, 2002.

On February 24, 2005, John Paul II named Aquila the administrator of the Diocese of Sioux Falls; that ended with the consecration of Paul J. Swain as bishop there in October 2006.

=== Archbishop of Denver ===
On May 29, 2012, Pope Benedict XVI named Aquila Archbishop of Denver. He was installed on July 18, 2012, at the Cathedral Basilica of the Immaculate Conception in Denver.

In 2018, Aquila released a letter on the sexual abuse charges against then-Cardinal Theodore McCarrick. Aquila said that a culture of selfishness and deviated sexual morals, which he claimed had increased since the sexual revolution of the 1960s, has deceived clergy and lay people into such behavior. He urged the Church to return to its principles of human dignity and love founded in Christ.

In September 2024, Aquila denounced Amendment 79, a proposed amendment to the Colorado State Constitution that would codify abortion rights for women in the state. Amendment 79 passed in November 2024 with a 61% majority.

Aquila submitted his resignation on his 75th birthday as required. Pope Leo XIV accepted it on February 7, 2026, naming James Robert Golka as his successor.

== See also ==
- Catholic Church hierarchy
- Catholic Church in the United States
- Historical list of the Catholic bishops of the United States
- List of Catholic bishops of the United States
- Lists of patriarchs, archbishops, and bishops

Catholic Church titles
Preceded by James Stephen Sullivan	Bishop of Fargo; March 18, 2002 – July 18, 2012	Succeeded by John Folda
Preceded by Charles Chaput	Archbishop of Denver; July 18, 2012 – February 7, 2026	Succeeded by James Robert Golka
