= Justin Albert Driscoll =

American Catholic bishop (1920–1984)

His Excellency, The Most Reverend Justin Albert Driscoll
- Bishop of Fargo
- See: Diocese of Fargo
- In office: 1970-1984
- Previous posts: President, Loras College (1967 to 1970)

Orders
- Ordination: July 28, 1945
- Consecration: October 18, 1971 by Archbishop Luigi Raimondi

Personal details
- Born: September 30, 1920 Bernard, Iowa, US
- Died: November 19, 1984 (aged 64) Bismarck, North Dakota, US
- Denomination: Roman Catholic
- Parents: William and Agnes (née Healey) Driscoll
- Education: Loras College; Catholic University of America
- Motto: To learn and serve Christ

Styles of Justin Albert Driscoll
- Reference style: His Excellency; The Most Reverend
- Spoken style: Your Excellency
- Religious style: Bishop

Justin Albert Driscoll (September 30, 1920 – November 19, 1984) was an American Roman Catholic clergyman. He served as president of Loras College in Iowa (1967–1970) and as bishop of Fargo in North Dakota (1970–1984).

== Biography ==
=== Early life ===
Justin Driscoll was born on September 30, 1920, in Bernard, Iowa, to William and Agnes (née Healey) Driscoll. He studied at Loras College in Dubuque, Iowa, obtaining a Bachelor of Arts degree in 1942. He completed his postgraduate studies at the Catholic University of America in Washington, D.C.

=== Priesthood ===
Driscoll was ordained to the priesthood for the Archdiocese of Dubuque at the Cathedral of Saint Raphael in Dubuque on July 28, 1945 by Archbishop Henry Rohlman. After his ordination, the archdiocese assigned Driscoll as a teacher at Loras Academy in Dubuque. In 1948, he became secretary to Rohlman. In 1952, Driscoll received his doctorate from Catholic University. Returning to Iowa, he served as secretary to Archbishop Leo Binz (1952–1953) and as superintendent of Catholic schools in the archdiocese (1953–1967).

=== President of Loras College ===
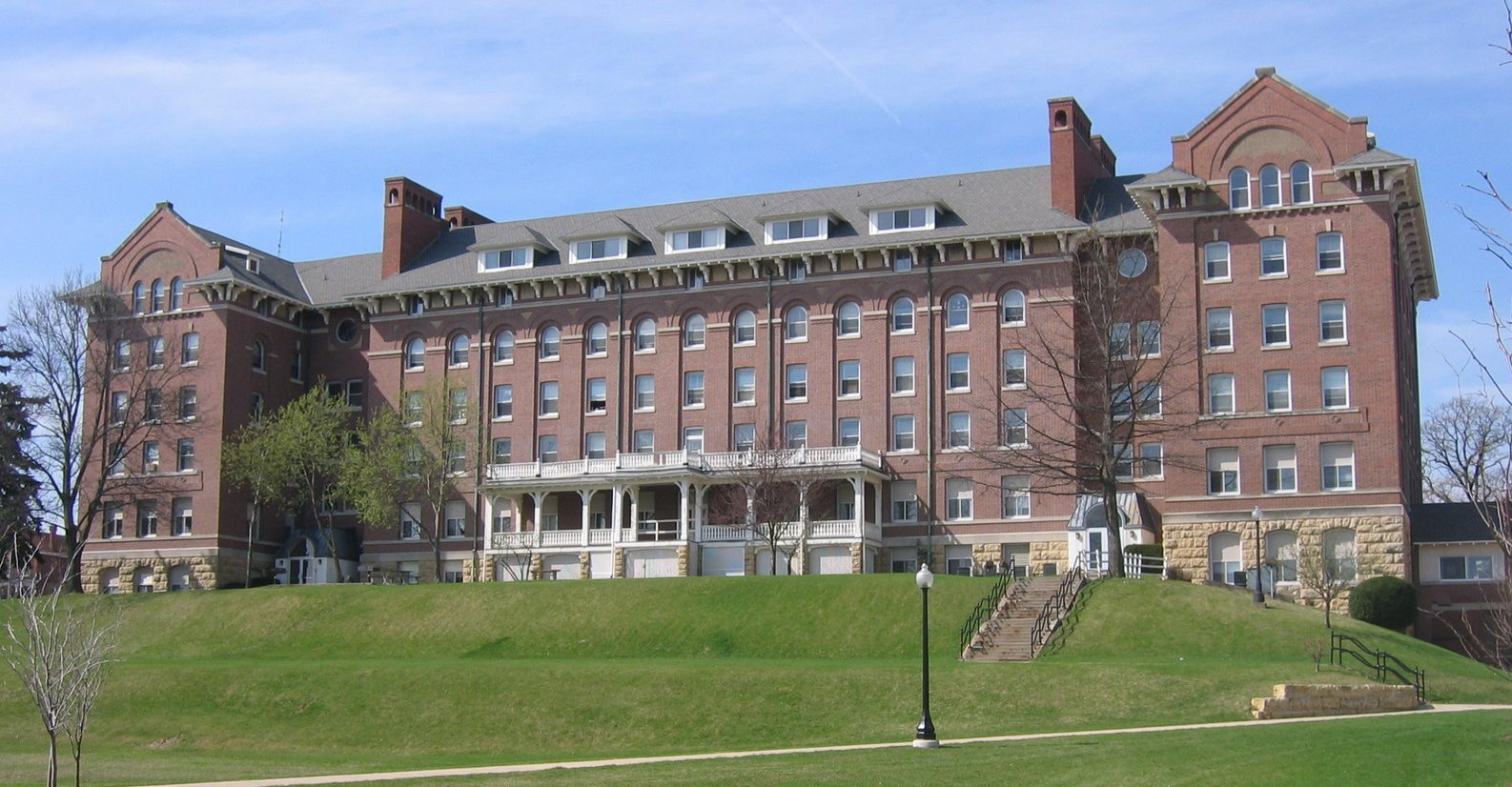
Loras College, Dubuque, Iowa (2005)

Driscoll was named president of Loras College in Dubuque in 1967. During his administration, he gave full scholarships to 16 African American students. According to later Loras President Francis Friedl, these students were supposedly radicalized after spending a summer at Operation Breadbasket, a community action group run by Reverend Jesse Jackson's in Chicago

In October 1969, the Black Student Union, composed of these 16 students, submitted a proposal to the college for a Black Culture House at Loras. When the Loras board of regents declined the proposal, the black students staged a occupation of a campus building on November 3rd. Driscoll negotiated with the students, but no agreement was reached before they voluntarily left the building after several hours.

Driscoll did not want to impose punishment on the students, but the college board of discipline suspended them for one semester.On November 8th, the start of their suspension, the 16 students refused to leave the campus. After a long meeting of civil rights leaders, student representatives and college officials, Driscoll on November 9th converted their suspensions into probationary periods.

=== Bishop of Fargo ===
On September 8, 1970, Driscoll was appointed the fifth bishop of Fargo by Pope Paul VI. He received his episcopal consecration on October 18, 1970. from Archbishop Luigi Raimondi, with Archbishops Leo Binz and James Byrne serving as co-consecrators.

Justin Driscoll died on November 19, 1984, in Bismarck, North Dakota, at age 64.

Catholic Church titles
Preceded by Leo Ferdinand Dworschak	Bishop of Fargo; 1970—1984	Succeeded by James Stephen Sullivan
