= Diocese of Fargo =

Latin Catholic jurisdiction in the US

Diocese of Fargo Dioecesis Fargensis

Catholic
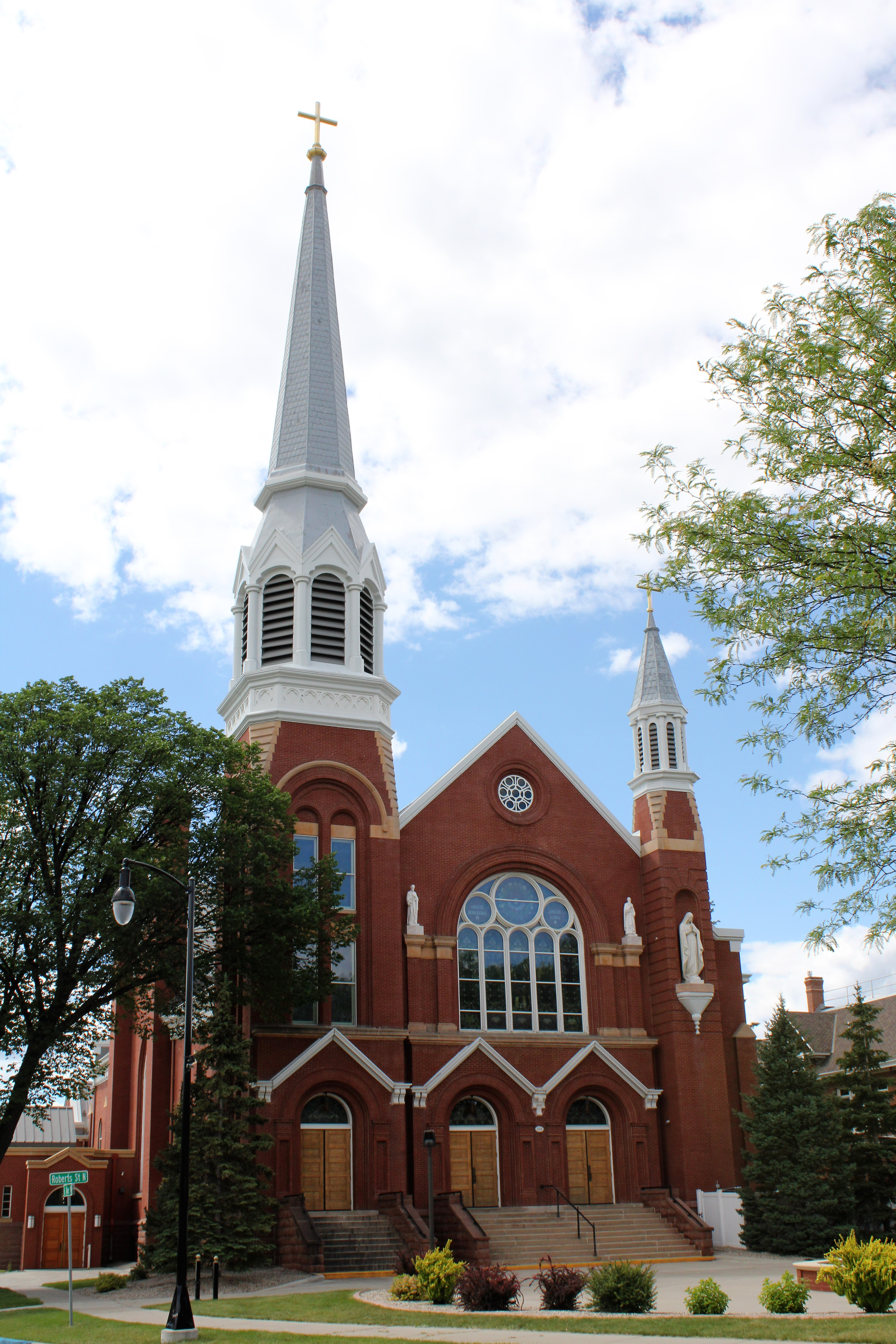
- Cathedral of St. Mary

- Coat of arms

Location
- Country: United States
- Territory: 30 counties in eastern North Dakota
- Episcopal conference: United States Conference of Catholic Bishops
- Ecclesiastical region: Region VIII
- Ecclesiastical province: Saint Paul and Minneapolis
- Deaneries: 8
- Headquarters: 5201 Bishops Blvd # A, Fargo, North Dakota 58104
- Coordinates: 46°52′38″N 96°47′22″W

Statistics
- Area: 35,786 sq mi (92,690 km^{2})
- Population: Total; Catholics: (as of 2021); 421,135 (Note: Annuario Pontificio (2022) via Catholic-Hierarchy.org); 69,658 (16.5%)
- Parishes: 129
- Schools: 14

Information
- Denomination: Catholic Church
- Sui iuris church: Latin Church
- Rite: Roman Rite
- Established: November 10, 1889 (136 years ago)
- Cathedral: Cathedral of St. Mary
- Patron saint: Our Lady of the Immaculate Conception
- Secular priests: 100, plus 7 religious priests

Current leadership
- Pope: Leo XIV
- Bishop: John Thomas Folda
- Metropolitan Archbishop: Bernard Hebda
- Vicar General: Joseph Goering

Map
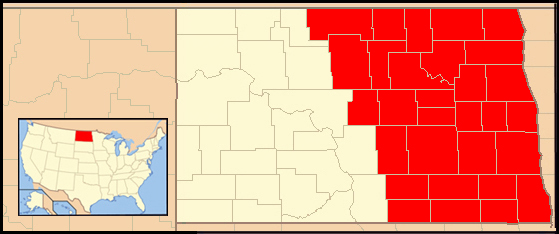

Website
- fargodiocese.org

The Diocese of Fargo (Latin: Dioecesis Fargensis) is a diocese of the Catholic Church in eastern North Dakota in the United States. It is a suffragan diocese of the metropolitan Archdiocese of Saint Paul and Minneapolis. The mother church is the Cathedral of St. Mary in Fargo. As of 2023, the bishop is John Folda.

== History ==
The Dakotas area went through several Catholic jurisdictions before the creation of the Diocese of Fargo:

- Diocese of Saint Louis (1826 to 1837)
- Diocese of Dubuque (1837 to 1850)
- Diocese of Saint Paul (1850 to 1879)
- Vicariate Apostolic of Dakota (1879 to 1889)

=== 1889 to 1900 ===
The Diocese of Jamestown was erected on November 10, 1889, by Pope Leo XIII, taking the new state of North Dakota from the Vicariate Apostolic of Dakota. The pope named John Shanley of Saint Paul as bishop of Jamestown. The new diocese covered the entire state of North Dakota. St. James Church was designated the diocesan cathedral.

That same year, Shanley wrote a letter to the Fargo Argus defending Native-Americans living on the Turtle Mountain Indian Reservation. He denounced actions taken by local Indian agents that hurt the Chippewa/Ojibwe people and highlighted positive aspects of their culture.

Once in Fargo, Shanley purchased property for a new cathedral and started its construction. The basement was completed when a fire destroyed most of downtown Fargo in 1893. Shanley then donated most of the cathedral funds to reconstruct Fargo, delaying the cathedral completion until 1899. Shanley hosted the convention of Catholic Laymen in 1896.

On April 6, 1897, the Vatican renamed the Diocese of Jamestown as the Diocese of Fargo. At this time, the diocese contained 60 churches, 33 priests, 14 schools and one hospital.

=== 1900 to 1970 ===
By the time Shanley died in July 1909, the diocese had 106 priests, 225 churches, six academies, 34 schools and four hospitals.Pope Pius X named James O'Reilly of Saint Paul as the second bishop of Fargo in December 1909. At the same time, Pope Pius X moved all of western North Dakota from the Diocese of Fargo to the new Diocese of Bismarck.

O'Reilly died in 1934 after 25 years as bishop. The next bishop of Fargo was Aloisius Muench of Saint Paul, appointed by Pope Pius XI in 1935. After World War II, Muench spent much of his time on Vatican assignments in West Germany while still serving as bishop of Fargo. While Muench was in Europe, Pope Pius XII appointed Bishop Leo Dworschak of the Diocese of Rapid City to serve as apostolic administrator in Fargo. In 1947, Pius XII named Dworschak as auxiliary bishop in Fargo. Muench resigned in 1959 as bishop of Fargo after being elevated to the rank of cardinal; Pope John XXIII in 1960 named Dworschak as Muench's replacement.

=== 1970 to present ===
After Dworschak retired in 1970, Pope Paul VI appointed Justin Driscoll, president of Loras College in Dubuque, Iowa, as the next bishop of Fargo. Driscoll died in 1984.

To replace Driscoll, Pope John Paul II named Auxiliary Bishop James Sullivan of the Diocese of Lansing. During his tenure, Sullivan established the Fargo Catholic Schools Network and the Opening Doors, Opening Hearts evangelization program. He improved the financial condition of the diocese and funded the Priest Pension Plan through the Shepherd's Care Campaign. In 2001, John Paul II named Samuel J. Aquila of Denver as coadjutor bishop of the diocese to assist Sullivan. When Sullivan resigned in 2002, Aquila succeeded him.

After Aquila was named archbishop of the Archdiocese of Denver in 2012, Pope Francis in 2013 named Monsignor John Folda of the Diocese of Lincoln to succeed him in Fargo. Folda, as of 2023, is the current bishop of Fargo.

=== Sex abuse ===
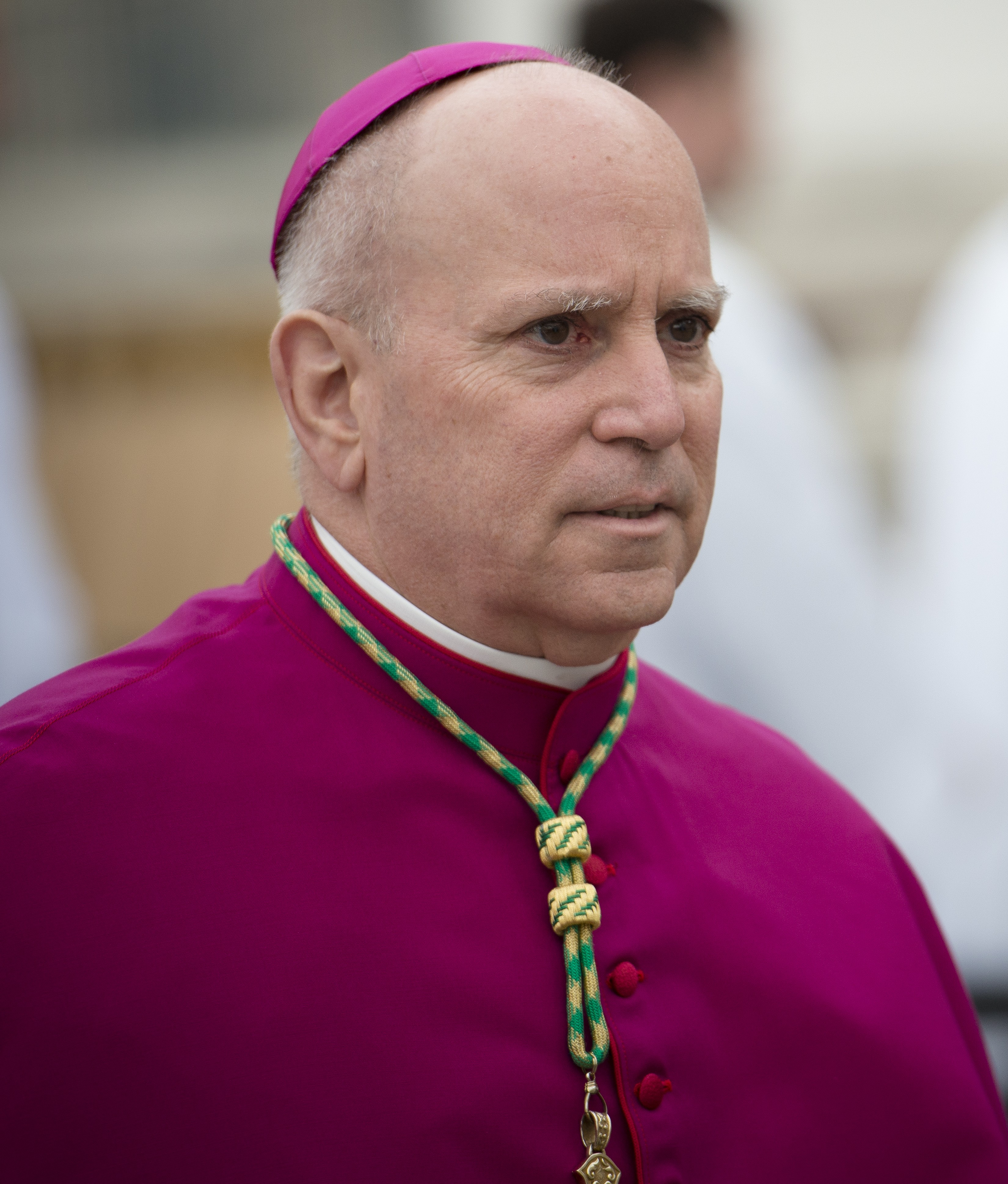
Archbishop Aquila (2014)

The diocese in 1998 removed Fernando Sayasaya from ministry at Blessed Sacrament Parish in Fargo after three teenage boys accused him of sexual abuse. Sayasaya went home to the Philippines in December 1998. In December 2002, he was charged with gross sexual imposition. The Vatican laicized Sayasaya in 2005. The Philippines ordered him extradited to the United States in 2010, but they were unable to apprehend him for seven years. In May 2018, after being transported to North Dakota, Sayasaya pleaded guilty to two counts of felony gross sexual imposition and was sentenced to 20 years in prison.

In a 2010 article, the Grand Forks Herald discussed a sexual abuse case it had originally reported in March 1994. A Grand Forks man had accused John Smythe, on assignment from Ireland in the Diocese of Fargo, of sexually assaulting him in 1981 in Langdon when the man was 12 years old. When contacted in 1994 by the Herald, the vicar general for the diocese said they had sent Smythe away for treatment. However, by later 1994, Smythe was in prison in Northern Ireland for sexually assaulting children there. Other alleged victims of Smythe in Langdon had come forward to the diocese in the meantime.

In January 2020, the diocese published a list of 31 diocesan clergy with credible accusations of sexual abuse of children, dating back to 1950.

In July 2021, the diocese announced that the Diocese of Lansing had confirmed several credible sexual abuse allegations against Bishop Sullivan. While assigned to the Church of the Resurrection Parish in Lansing, Michigan, in the 1960s, Sullivan allegedly touched two young boys inappropriately and used sexual language with them. After the announcement, the John Paul II Catholic Schools network in Fargo renamed Sullivan Middle School as Sacred Heart Middle School.

== Bishops ==
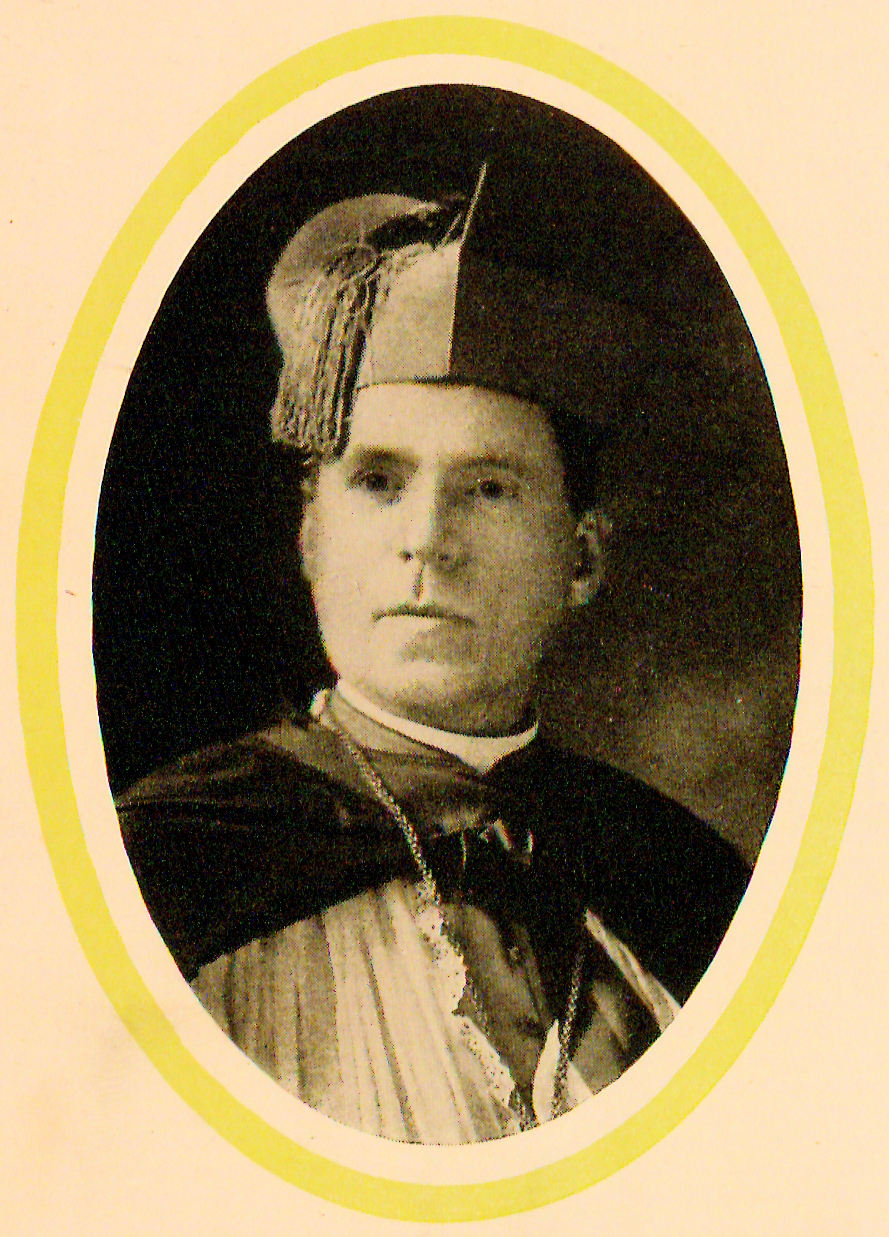
Bishop O'Reilly (1913)

=== Bishop of Jamestown ===
John Shanley (1889–1909)

=== Bishops of Fargo ===
1. John Shanley (1889–1909)
2. James O'Reilly (1909–1934)
3. Aloisius Joseph Muench (1935–1959), appointed Apostolic Nuncio and Titular Archbishop (elevated to Cardinal in 1959)
4. Leo Ferdinand Dworschak (1960–1970)
5. Justin Albert Driscoll (1970–1984)
6. James Stephen Sullivan (1985–2002)
7. Samuel Joseph Aquila (2002–2012), appointed Archbishop of Denver
8. John Thomas Folda (2013–present)

=== Other diocesan priests who became bishops ===
- Raymond W. Lessard, appointed Bishop of Savannah in 1973
- William Theodore Mulloy, appointed Bishop of Covington in 1944
- Vincent James Ryan, appointed Bishop of Bismarck in 1940

== Education ==
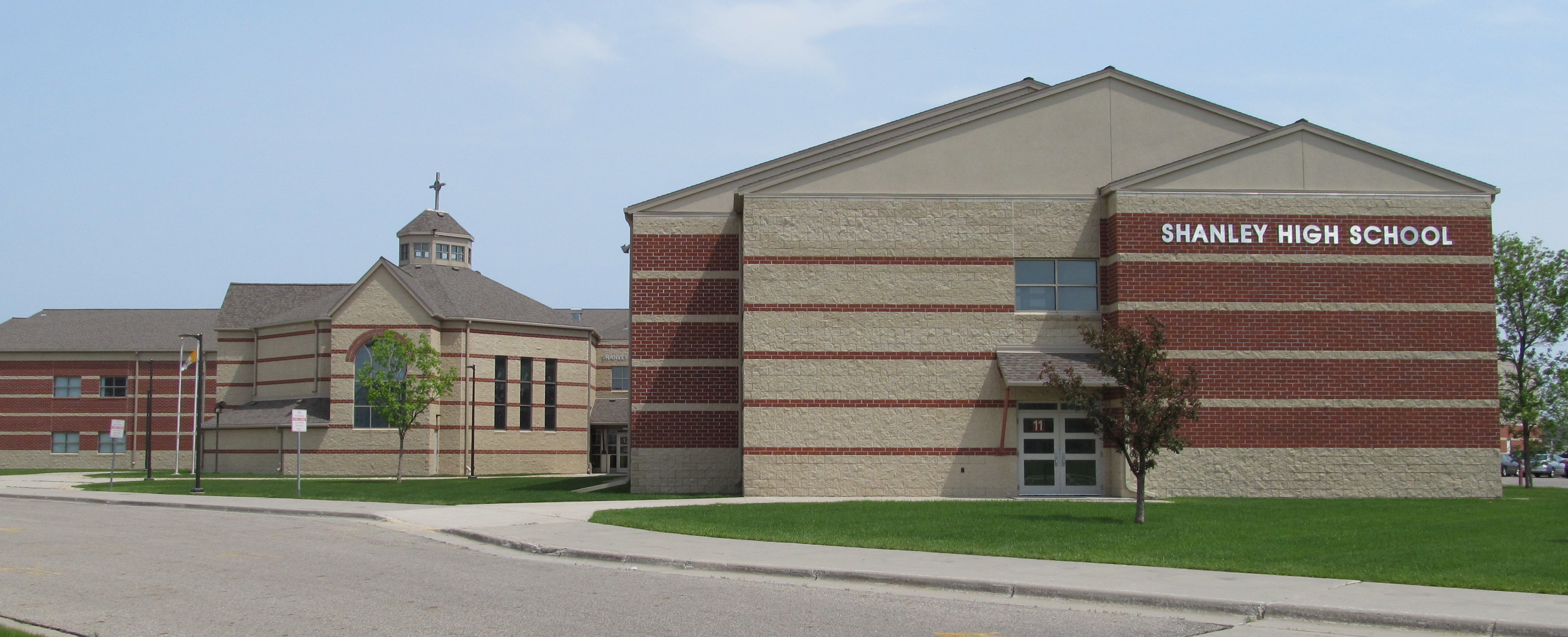
Shanley High School, Fargo

As of 2023, the Diocese of Fargo has one high school and 13 primary and middle schools.

=== Schools ===
List of Catholic schools in the diocese
School	Location	Established	Affiliation(s)
Primary and middle schools
Holy Family-St. Mary's Catholic School	Grand Forks	2005	
Holy Spirit Catholic Elementary School	Fargo	1953	
Nativity Elementary School	Fargo	1961	Sisters of the Presentation of Mary (former)
St. Alphonsus School	Langdon	1941	
St. Ann's Native American Catholic Elementary School	Belcourt	1999	Society of Our Lady of the Most Holy Trinity
St. Catherine Elementary School	Valley City		
St. John's Academy	Jamestown		
St. Joseph Catholic School	Devils Lake	1957	Sisters of Mercy (former)
St. Michael's Catholic School	Devils Lake	1916	Sisters of St. Joseph (former)
St. Therese the Little Flower Catholic Elementary School	Rugby	1943	
Sacred Heart Middle School	Fargo		
Secondary schools
Shanley High School	Fargo	1882	De La Salle Christian Brothers (former) Presentation Sisters (former)

== Coat of arms ==
Coat of arms of Diocese of Fargo
Notes Arms was designed and adopted when the diocese was erected Adopted 1897 Escutcheon The background of the arms is a blue field. It contains a gold cross with a blue horseshoe. The background also displays a golden sheaf of wheat. Symbolism Blue and gold are the traditional colors of Mary, mother of Jesus. The horseshoe evokes William Fargo, founder of the pony express. The wheat sheaf honors the major crop of North Dakota, used to make the eucharist.
