= Belle Creek (Crow River tributary) =

Stream in Meeker County, Minnesota, U.S.

Coordinates: 44°57′55″N 94°40′06″W

Belle Creek is a stream in Meeker County, in the U.S. state of Minnesota. It is a tributary of the Crow River.

Belle Creek bears the name of a pioneer farmer.

== See also ==
- List of rivers of Minnesota
