= Journal of Ecumenical Studies =

- Discipline: Religious studies
- Language: English
- Edited by: David Krueger

Publication details
- History: 1964 to present
- Publisher: University of Pennsylvania Press for the Dialogue Institute (United States)
- Frequency: Quarterly

Standard abbreviations
- ISO 4: J. Ecum. Stud.

Indexing
- ISSN: 0022-0558 (print); 2162-3937 (web)

Links
- Journal homepage; Journal at the University of Pennsylvania Press; Journal at Project MUSE

The Journal of Ecumenical Studies is a peer-reviewed academic journal established in 1964 and published by the University of Pennsylvania Press on behalf of the Dialogue Institute and the North American Academy of Ecumenists. Its editor-in-chief is David Krueger (Temple University). The journal was founded on dialogue between different forms of Christianity, then broadened over time to cover an extensive range of religious traditions. It is abstracted and indexed in the Arts & Humanities Citation Index and Current Contents/Arts & Humanities.
