= Belle Creek Township, Goodhue County, Minnesota =

Belle Creek Township, Minnesota
- Township
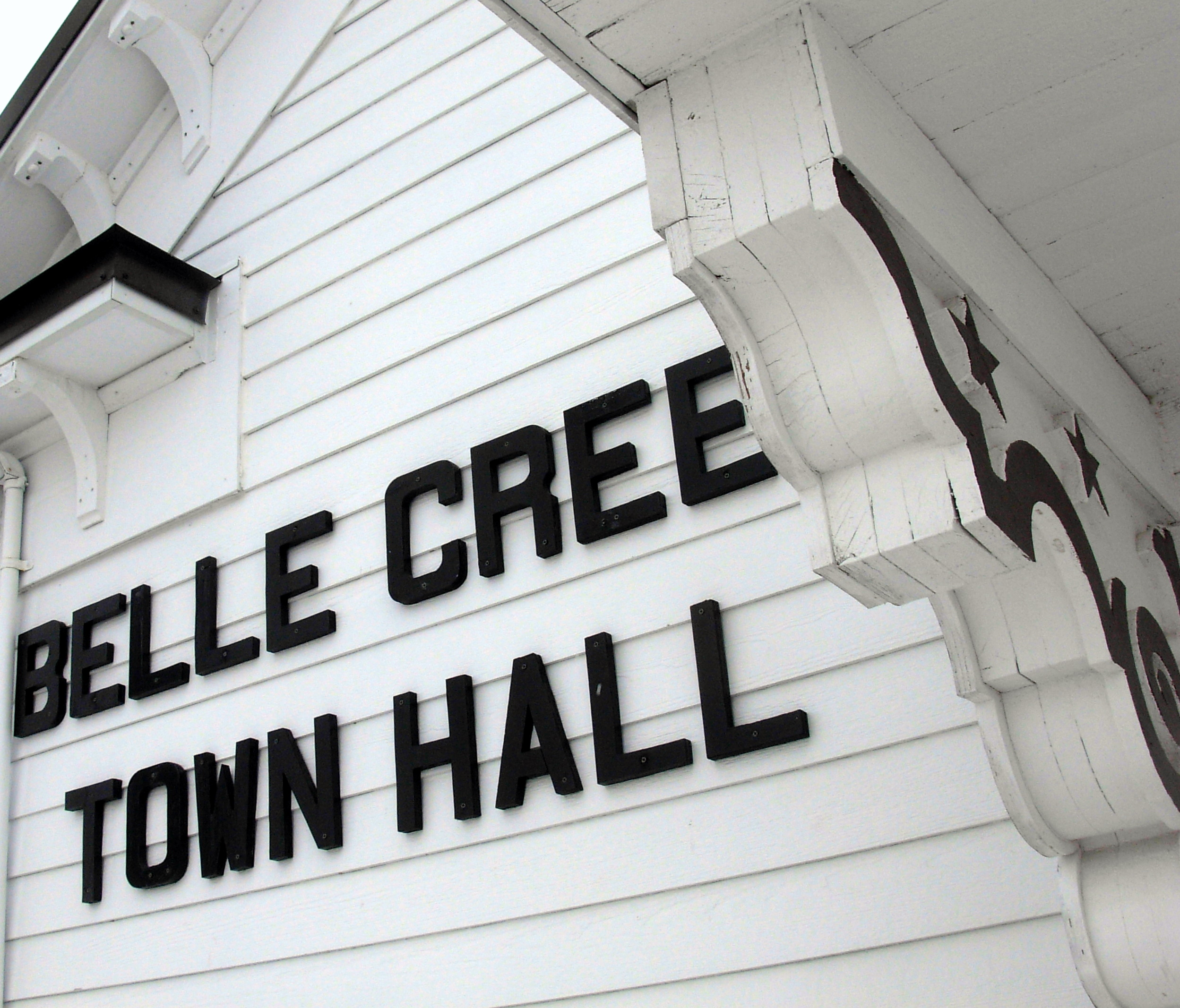
- Belle Creek Town Hall

- Location within the state of Minnesota Belle Creek Township, Minnesota (the United States)
- Coordinates: 44°25′32″N 92°44′44″W
- Country: United States
- State: Minnesota
- County: Goodhue

Area
  - Total: 35.6 sq mi (92.3 km^{2})
  - Land: 35.6 sq mi (92.3 km^{2})
  - Water: 0 sq mi (0.0 km^{2})
- Elevation: 1,175 ft (358 m)

Population (2000)
  - Total: 437
  - Density: 12/sq mi (4.7/km^{2})
- Time zone: UTC-6 (Central (CST))
  - Summer (DST): UTC-5 (CDT)
- FIPS code: 27-04816
- GNIS feature ID: 0663554

Belle Creek Township is a township in Goodhue County, Minnesota, United States. The population was 437 at the 2000 census.

== History ==
Belle Creek Township was organized in 1858, and took its name from the Belle Creek.

== Geography ==
According to the United States Census Bureau, the township has a total area of 35.6 square miles (92 km^{2}), all land.

== Demographics ==
As of the census of 2000, there were 437 people, 159 households, and 121 families residing in the township. The population density was 12.3 inhabitants per square mile (4.7/km^{2}). There were 165 housing units at an average density of 4.6 per square mile (1.8/km^{2}). The racial makeup of the township was 98.63% White, 0.23% Pacific Islander, and 1.14% from two or more races.

There were 159 households, out of which 40.3% had children under the age of 18 living with them, 68.6% were married couples living together, 4.4% had a female householder with no husband present, and 23.3% were non-families. 20.1% of all households were made up of individuals, and 9.4% had someone living alone who was 65 years of age or older. The average household size was 2.75 and the average family size was 3.23.

In the township the population was spread out, with 30.7% under the age of 18, 8.2% from 18 to 24, 27.2% from 25 to 44, 20.8% from 45 to 64, and 13.0% who were 65 years of age or older. The median age was 36 years. For every 100 females, there were 114.2 males. For every 100 females age 18 and over, there were 119.6 males.

The median income for a household in the township was $52,188, and the median income for a family was $53,500. Males had a median income of $35,179 versus $22,000 for females. The per capita income for the township was $20,226. About 5.5% of families and 7.6% of the population were below the poverty line, including 11.9% of those under age 18 and 8.9% of those age 65 or over.
