= Cathedral of St. Mary (Fargo, North Dakota) =

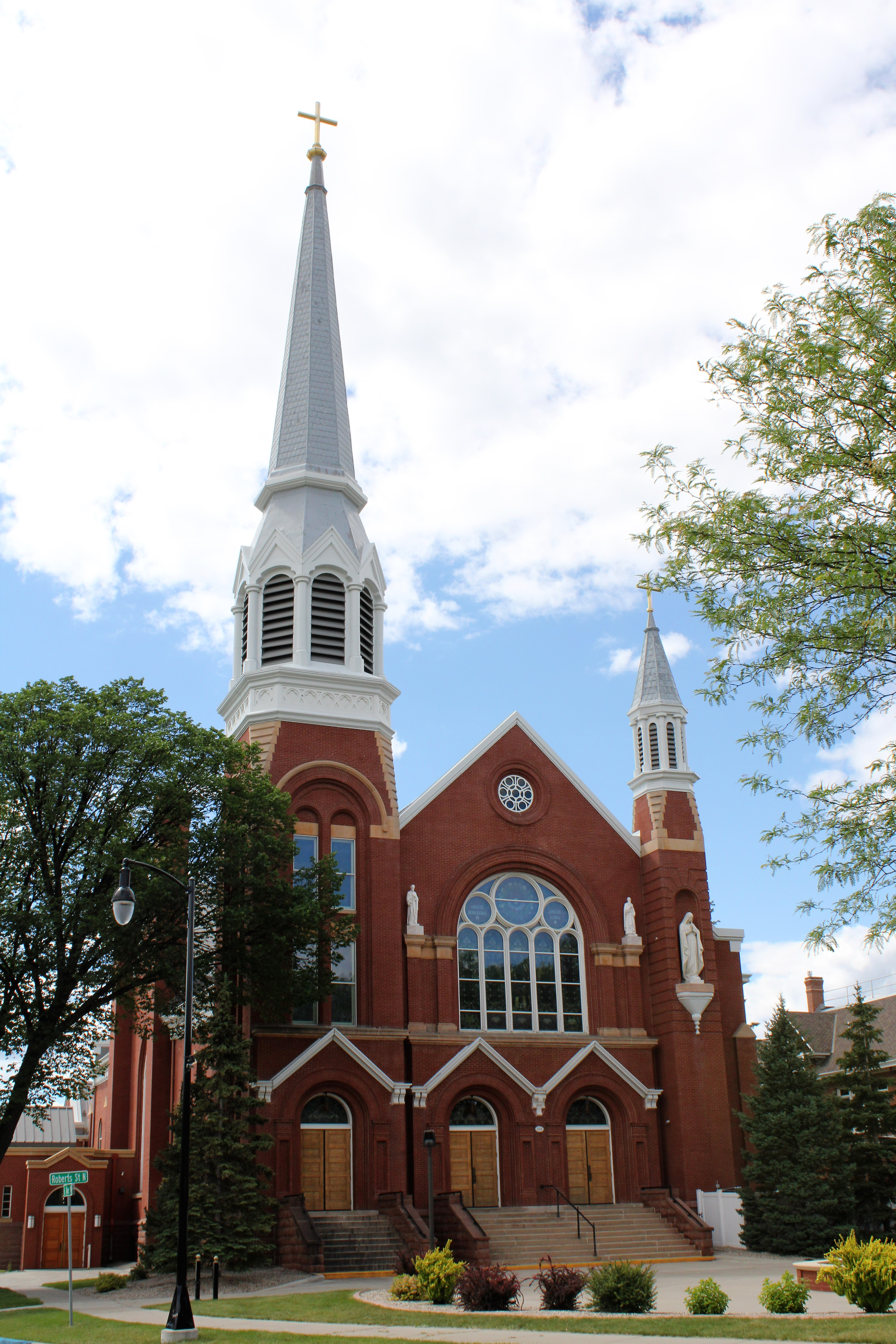
- Cathedral of St. Mary
- 46°52′57″N 96°47′19″W
- Location: 604 Broadway; Fargo, North Dakota
- Country: United States
- Denomination: Catholic
- Website: www.cathedralofstmary.com

History
- Status: Cathedral/Parish church
- Founded: 1880
- Dedication: Blessed Virgin Mary
- Dedicated: May 30, 1899

Architecture
- Architect: Edward P. Bassford
- Style: Romanesque Revival
- Completed: 1899

Specifications
- Materials: Brick

Administration
- Diocese: Fargo

Clergy
- Bishop: Most Rev. John Folda
- Rector: Rev. Msgr. Joseph Goering

The Cathedral of St. Mary is a Catholic cathedral located in Fargo, North Dakota, United States. It is a parish church and the seat of the Diocese of Fargo.

== History ==
St. Mary's parish was founded in 1880. What would become the Diocese of Fargo was established nine years later as the Diocese of Jamestown, and at the time it encompassed the entire state of North Dakota. St. James Church in Jamestown became the cathedral. The diocese's first bishop, John Shanley, moved his residence to the Island Park area of Fargo in 1891. The Holy See changed the name of the diocese to Fargo in 1897.

Bishop Shanley purchased property for a new cathedral and had plans created. The basement was completed when a fire destroyed most of downtown Fargo in 1893. Shanley donated a large portion of the funds that he had personally raised for the new cathedral to reconstruct the city after the fire. Construction on the cathedral was, therefore, delayed. St. Mary's Cathedral was completed and it was dedicated on May 30, 1899.

== Architecture ==
St. Paul, Minnesota architect Edward P. Bassford designed the present church building in the Romanesque Revival style. The brick structure follows a modified basilica plan with an apse at the western end. Its six bays are divided by buttresses. The main facade features two uneven towers. The larger of the towers rises 172 feet (52 m), and contains a single bell. A statue of the Blessed Virgin Mary is located in a niche on the smaller tower. Statues of St. Peter and St. Paul flank the large arched window on the facade. The nave is divided into three aisles and the barrel vaulted ceiling has a cross vault at the transept.

The vestibule at the southern entrance was expanded in 2011 to comply with guidelines of the Americans with Disabilities Act of 1990.

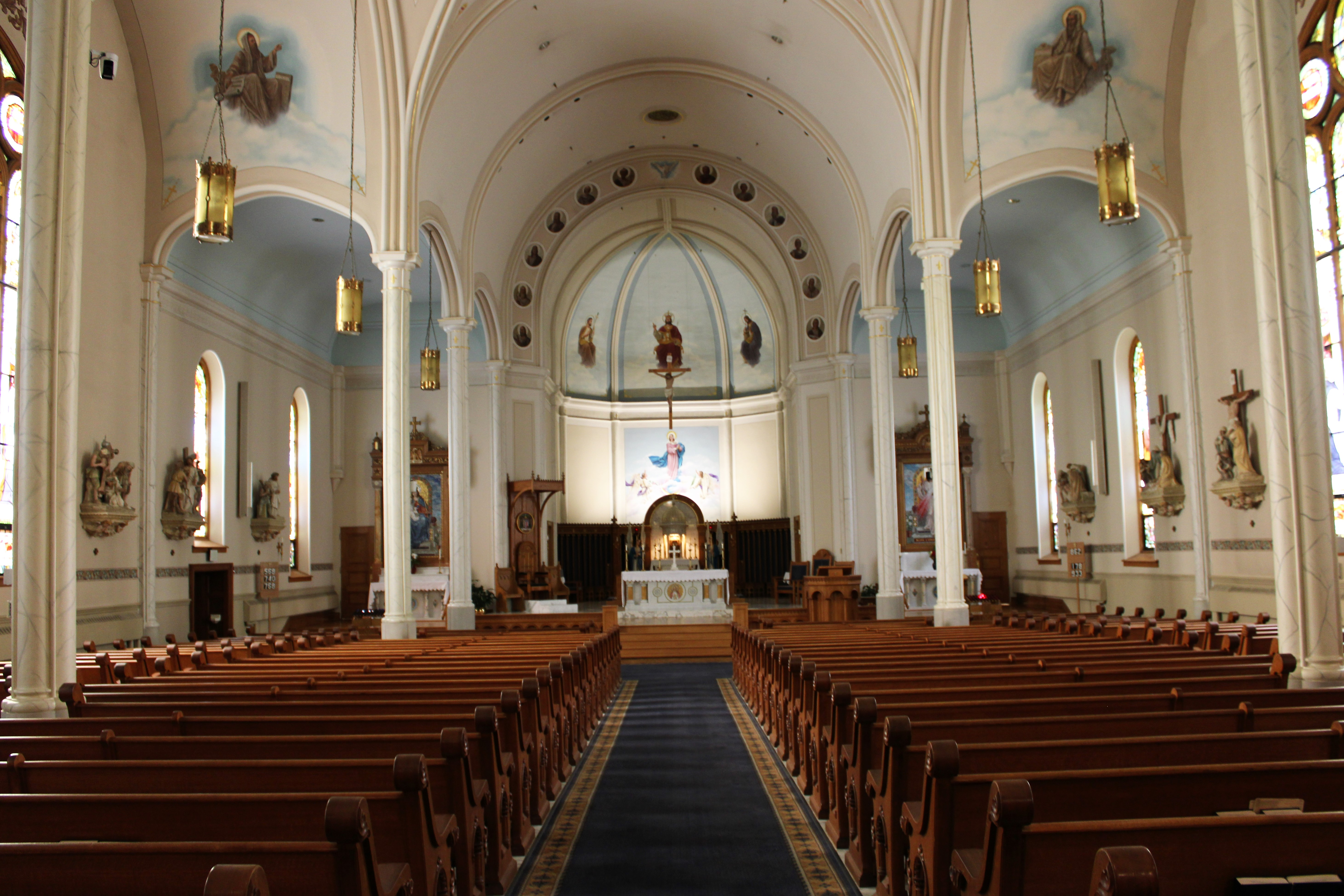
Nave looking toward the sanctuary

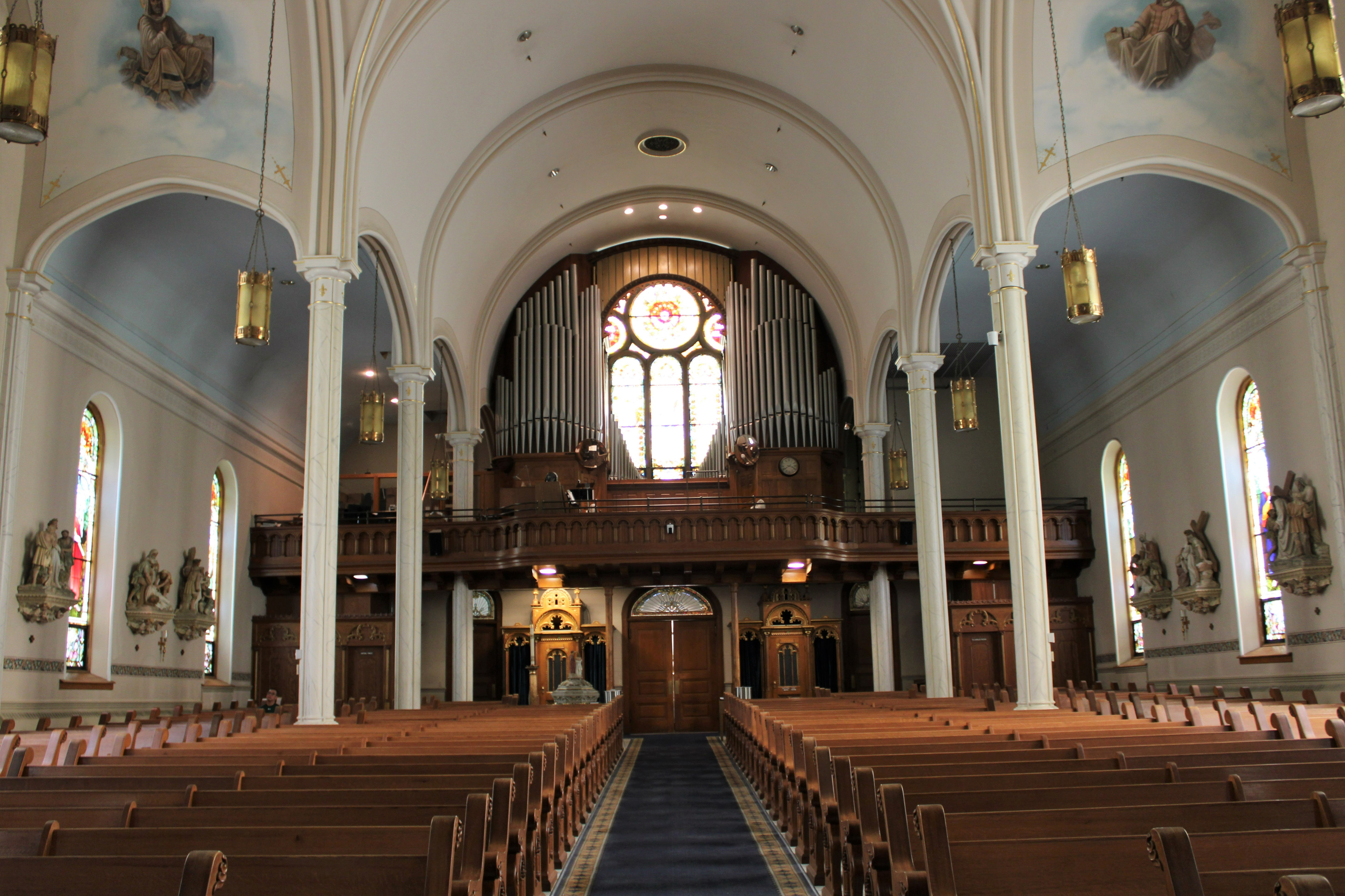
Nave looking toward gallery

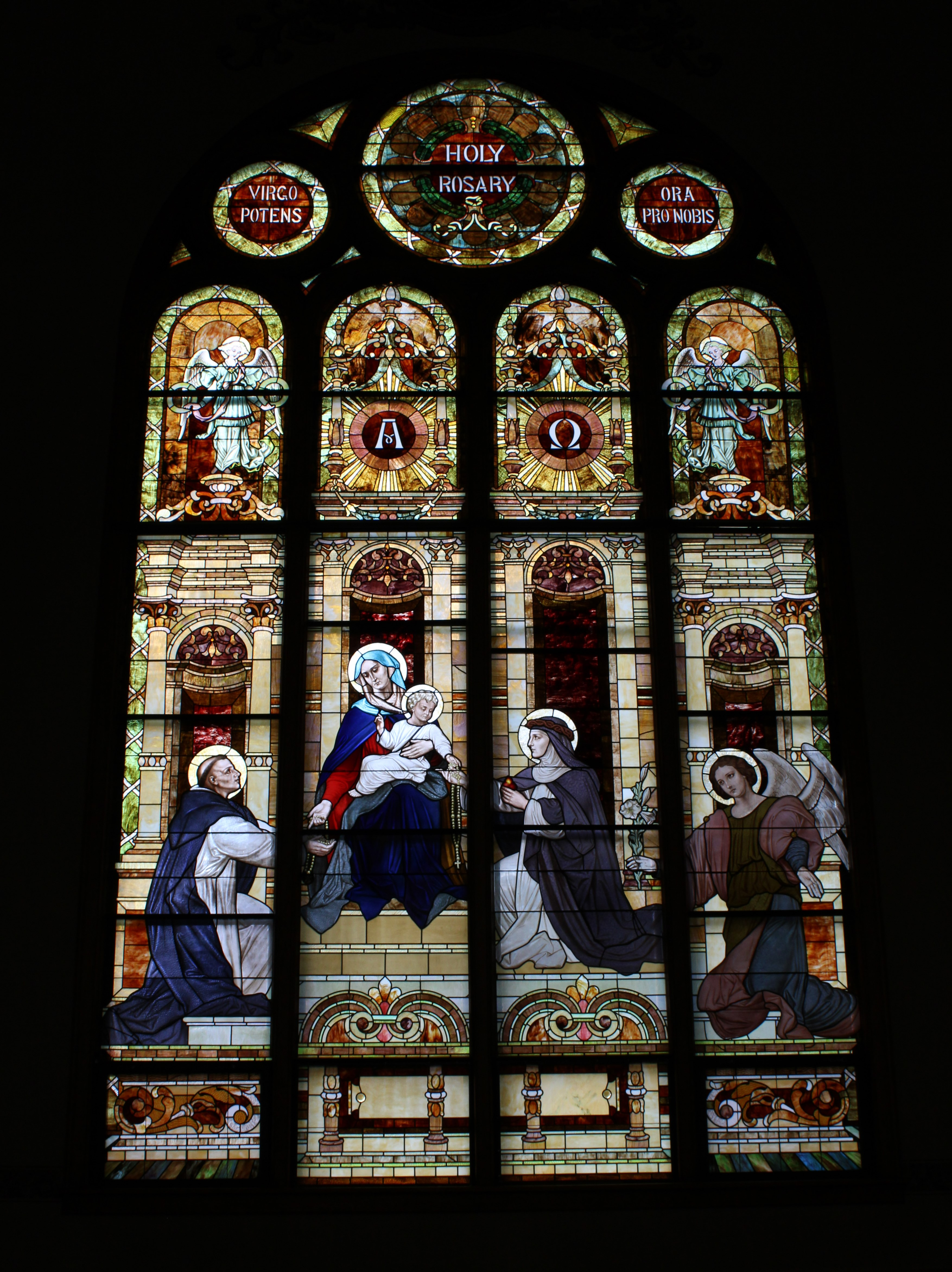
Stained glass window

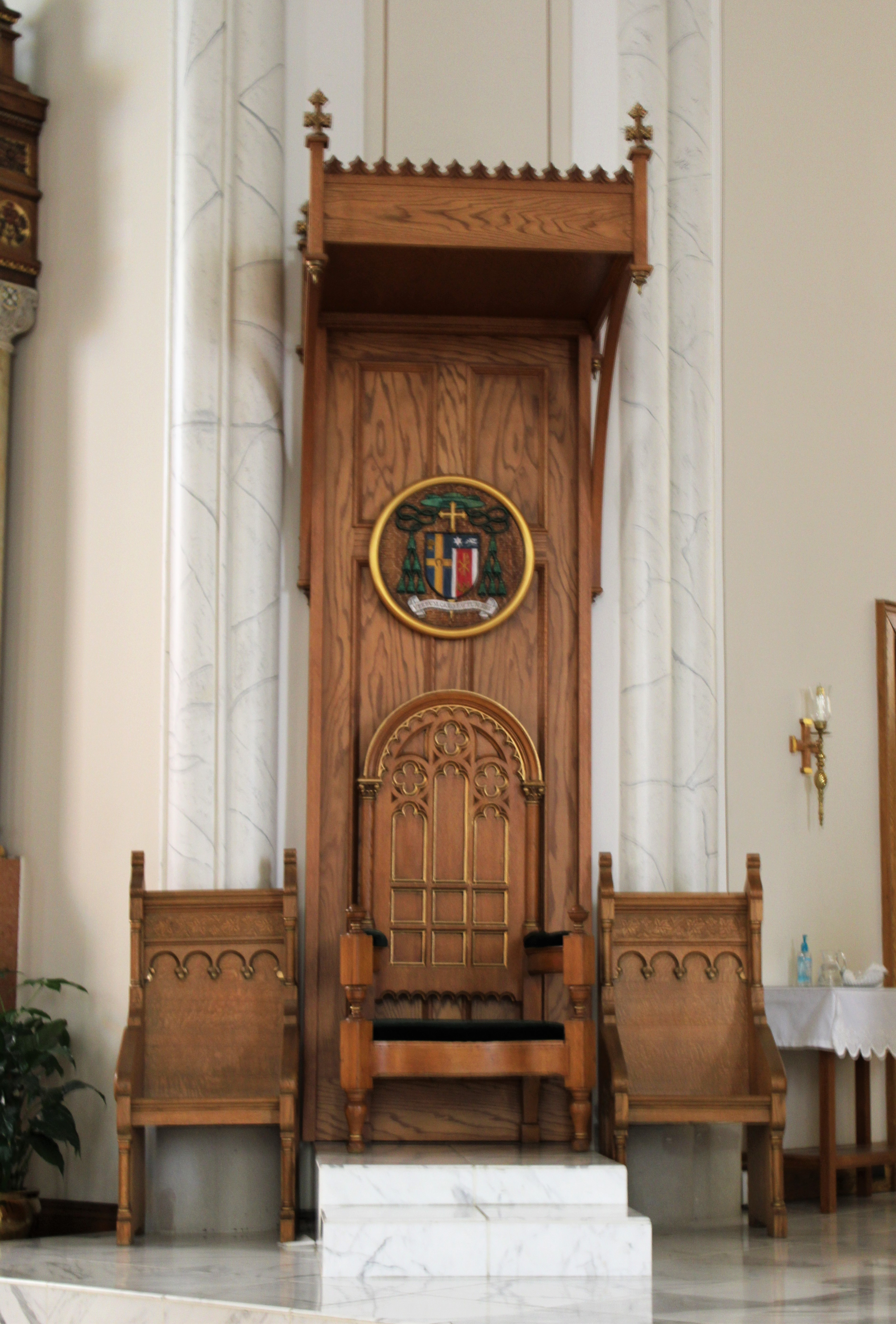
Cathedra

== See also ==
- List of Catholic cathedrals in the United States
- List of cathedrals in the United States
