= James Stephen Sullivan =

American prelate (1929–2006)

His Excellency, The Most Reverend James Stephen Sullivan
- Bishop of Fargo; Titular Bishop of Siccesi
- Church: Roman Catholic Church
- See: Diocese of Fargo
- Predecessor: Justin Albert Driscoll
- Successor: Samuel Joseph Aquila
- Other posts: Auxiliary Bishop of Lansing 1972 to 1985; Titular Bishop of Siccesi

Orders
- Ordination: June 4, 1955 by Joseph H. Albers
- Consecration: September 21, 1972 by Alexander M. Zaleski

Personal details
- Born: July 23, 1929 Kalamazoo, Michigan, US
- Died: June 12, 2006 (aged 76)
- Education: St. Joseph Seminary; Sacred Heart Seminary; St. John Provincial Seminary
- Motto: Lord teach us

Styles of James Stephen Sullivan
- Reference style: His Excellency; The Most Reverend
- Spoken style: Your Excellency
- Religious style: Bishop

James Stephen Sullivan (July 23, 1929 – June 12, 2006) was an American prelate of the Roman Catholic Church. He served as Bishop of the Diocese of Fargo in North Dakota from 1985 to 2002. He previously served as an Auxiliary Bishop of the Diocese of Lansing in Michigan from 1972 to 1985.

In 2021, the Diocese of Lansing reported that Sullivan had been credibly accused of sexually abusing minors during the 1960s

== Biography ==
=== Early life ===
Sullivan was born on July 23, 1929, in Kalamazoo, Michigan, to Stephen and Dorothy (née Bernier) Sullivan. After attending St. Augustine Cathedral School in Kalamazoo, he attended high school and two years of college at St. Joseph Seminary in Grand Rapids. He then studied at Sacred Heart Seminary in Detroit, where he obtained a Bachelor of Arts degree in 1951. He completed his theological studies at St. John's Provincial Seminary in Plymouth, Michigan.

=== Priesthood ===
Sullivan was ordained to the priesthood for the Diocese of Lansing by Bishop Joseph H. Albers on June 4, 1955. After doing pastoral work in Flint, Lansing, and St. Joseph, he served as private secretary to Bishop Albers and his successor Bishop Alexander M. Zaleski, and then as assistant chancellor and vicar general of the diocese. He also served as vocations director and founder of Liturgical Publications.

=== Auxiliary Bishop of Lansing ===
On July 25, 1972, Sullivan was appointed auxiliary bishop of Lansing and titular bishop of Siccesi by Pope Paul VI. He received his episcopal consecration at Saint Mary Cathedral in Lansing on September 21, 1972, from Zaleski, with Bishops Michael Green and Paul Vincent Donovan serving as co-consecrators.

=== Bishop of Fargo ===
Following the death of Bishop Justin Driscoll, Sullivan was named the sixth bishop of Fargo by Pope John Paul II on March 29, 1985. He was installed at St. Mary's Cathedral on May 30, 1985.

During his tenure, Sullivan established the Fargo Catholic Schools Network and the Opening Doors, Opening Hearts evangelization program. He improved the financial condition of the diocese and funded the Priest Pension Plan through the Shepherd's Care Campaign. Sullivan became nationally known for his work against abortion rights for women, initiating the annual Walk with Christ for Life in 1992. In 1993 he was chosen by John Paul II to address the English-speaking audience attending World Youth Day in Denver, Colorado. Sullivan also served as episcopal liaison to the Cursillo movement and the Catholic Marketing Association, as president of the World Apostolate of Fatima, and as a member of the advisory board for Catholics United for the Faith.

=== Resignation and legacy ===
John Paul II accepted Sullivan's resignation as bishop of Fargo on March 18, 2002. He resided at the rectory at Holy Spirit Parish in Fargo before moving to Rosewood on Broadway, a skilled nursing facility, in 2006.

James Sullivan died of complications from Alzheimer's disease on June 12, 2006, at age 76.

In July 2021, the Diocese of Lansing announced that several sexual abuse allegations against Sullivan were credible. While assigned to Church of the Resurrection Parish in Lansing in the 1960s, he inappropriately touched and used sexual language with two young boys. Immediately following this news, the John Paul II Catholic Schools network in Fargo renamed Sullivan Middle School as Sacred Heart Middle School.

Catholic Church titles
Preceded by Justin Albert Driscoll	Bishop of Fargo; 1985—2002	Succeeded by Samuel Joseph Aquila
