= Belle Creek (Cannon River tributary) =

- Mouth of Belle Creek
- Native name: Belle (French)

Location
- Country: United States
- State: Minnesota
- County: Goodhue

Physical characteristics
- Source
  - coordinates: 44.3696876°N 92.8327004°W
- Mouth
  - location: Harliss, Minnesota
  - coordinates: 44.5541338°N 92.7004749°W

Basin features
- River system: Cannon River (Minnesota)

Belle Creek is a trout stream in Goodhue County, in the U.S. state of Minnesota. It is a tributary of the Cannon River.

Belle is a name derived from French meaning "beautiful".

== See also ==
- List of rivers of Minnesota
