= National Register of Historic Places listings in Goodhue County, Minnesota =

Location of Goodhue County in Minnesota

This is a list of the National Register of Historic Places listings in Goodhue County, Minnesota. It is intended to be a complete list of the properties and districts on the National Register of Historic Places in Goodhue County, Minnesota, United States. The locations of National Register properties and districts for which the latitude and longitude coordinates are included below, may be seen in an online map.

There are 63 properties and districts listed on the National Register in the county. A supplementary list includes six additional sites that were formerly listed on the National Register.

This National Park Service list is complete through NPS recent listings posted April 17, 2026.

== Current listings ==
| | Name on the Register | Image | Date listed | Location | City or town | Description |
|---|---|---|---|---|---|---|
| 1 | Alexander P. Anderson Estate-Tower View | Alexander P. Anderson Estate-Tower View | April 13, 1977 (#77000734) | 163 Tower View Dr. 44°34′12″N 92°38′17″W | Red Wing | Unique farm/residence/laboratory complex dating to 1916, long-time venue for botanical, biological, medical, and technological research. Now the Anderson Center at Tower View artist retreat. |
| 2 | Bank of Pine Island, Opera House Block | Bank of Pine Island, Opera House Block | February 12, 1980 (#80002052) | 222 Main St. 44°12′04″N 92°38′48″W | Pine Island | Elaborate 1895 bank/opera house exemplifying the late-19th-century maturation in southeast Minnesota's booming towns. Name change (originally Opera Block House) with additional documentation, October 9, 2013. |
| 3 | Bartron Site | Bartron Site | October 15, 1970 (#70000294) | Address restricted | Red Wing vicinity | One of only two major Mississippian culture sites known on the Minnesota side of the Mississippi River valley, of particular archaeological value because it hasn't been disturbed by plowing. |
| 4 | George Baslington Farmhouse | George Baslington Farmhouse | February 12, 1980 (#80002050) | 20446 480th St. 44°15′10″N 92°37′17″W | Pine Island vicinity | Rare surviving example of southeast Minnesota's crude first farmhouses, consisting of an 1850s log cabin with two later additions. Partially collapsed or demolished as of April 2014. |
| 5 | Bridge No. 12 | Bridge No. 12 | November 6, 1989 (#89001837) | Township Rd. 43 over Bullard Creek; 44°32′31″N 92°26′20″W | Red Wing vicinity | 1908 pony truss bridge, a common early-20th-century style for short spans and an example of early state efforts to standardize bridge designs. |
| 6 | Jacob A. and Mary Finn Bringgold House | Jacob A. and Mary Finn Bringgold House | May 9, 2014 (#14000216) | 318 2nd St. SW; 44°12′04″N 92°39′04″W | Pine Island | Leading local example of Queen Anne architecture, built c. 1903. |
| 7 | Anna and Samuel Murry Burpee House | Anna and Samuel Murry Burpee House | February 12, 1980 (#80002051) | 314 2nd St. SW; 44°12′04″N 92°39′03″W | Pine Island | 1895 Queen Anne house. Previously listed on the National Register under the name Jacob Bringgold House. |
| 8 | Cannon Falls Commercial Historic District | Cannon Falls Commercial Historic District | January 7, 2000 (#99001654) | 4th St. between Mill and Main Sts. 44°30′27″N 92°54′21″W | Cannon Falls | Well preserved central business district of an agricultural service community, with 24 contributing properties mostly dating to the 1880s and 90s. |
| 9 | Cannon Falls School | Cannon Falls School | February 12, 1980 (#80002039) | 115 W. Minnesota St. 44°30′39″N 92°54′07″W | Cannon Falls | School building with interconnected 1893 and 1912 wings, representative of the large schools that appeared in southeast Minnesota's rapidly growing towns at the end of the 19th century. |
| 10 | Carleton Airport | Carleton Airport | July 21, 2004 (#04000722) | 1235 Minnesota Highway 19; 44°28′21″N 93°00′51″W | Stanton vicinity | 1942 airfield established by Carleton College to offer flight training during World War II; the most intact of Minnesota's 25 War Training Service sites. Now Stanton Airfield. |
| 11 | G.A. Carlson Lime Kiln | G.A. Carlson Lime Kiln | September 27, 1976 (#76001053) | E. 5th St. 44°34′10″N 92°31′10″W | Red Wing | 1882 lime kiln representative of the area's important limestone quarrying and lime producing industry. |
| 12 | Chicago Great Western Depot | Chicago Great Western Depot | June 4, 1980 (#80002056) | 726 W. Main St. 44°33′53″N 92°32′22″W | Red Wing | One of Red Wing's two major train stations, built in 1906; a symbol of the area's crucial rail infrastructure. |
| 13 | Church of St. Rose of Lima | Church of St. Rose of Lima | August 13, 2013 (#13000597) | 8778 County 11 Blvd. 44°13′06″N 92°51′24″W | Kenyon vicinity | 1879 church and adjacent cemetery, focal point of a rural Catholic Irish immigrant community locally representative of the mid-nineteenth-century Irish diaspora. |
| 14 | Church of the Redeemer-Episcopal | Church of the Redeemer-Episcopal | February 12, 1980 (#80002040) | 123 N. 3rd St. 44°30′28″N 92°54′14″W | Cannon Falls | One of southeast Minnesota's best-preserved first-generation churches, built 1866–67. Also representative of the influence of the region's Protestant settlers. |
| 15 | Cross of Christ Lutheran Church | Cross of Christ Lutheran Church | February 12, 1980 (#80002057) | 24036 County 7 Blvd. 44°36′01″N 92°43′47″W | Welch vicinity | 1878 example of the characteristic steepled churches built in southeast Minnesota's Swedish American communities. |
| 16 | Dammon Round Barn | Dammon Round Barn | February 12, 1980 (#80002058) | 28650 Wildwood Ln. 44°32′49″N 92°27′37″W | Red Wing vicinity | 1914 round barn representing the creative, purpose-built solutions of the region's farmers in the transition from wheat growing to dairying. Now part of a bed and breakfast. |
| 17 | District No. 20 School | District No. 20 School | February 12, 1980 (#80002059) | 31721 Minnesota 58; 44°29′20″N 92°32′59″W | Hay Creek | Exemplary one-room school built in 1889, representing the typical venue for education in rural Minnesota in the latter 19th century. |
| 18 | Ellsworth Hotel Livery Stable | Ellsworth Hotel Livery Stable | February 12, 1980 (#80002043) | 210 4th St. 44°30′30″N 92°54′21″W | Cannon Falls | Circa-1871 hotel stable, the last surviving remnant of Cannon Falls' pioneer-era commerce. Also a contributing property to the Cannon Falls Commercial Historic District. |
| 19 | Firemen's Hall | Firemen's Hall | February 12, 1980 (#80002041) | 206 W. Mill St. 44°30′29″N 92°54′12″W | Cannon Falls | 1888 fire station reflecting the peril from and response to fires in the period's communities. Now the Cannon Falls Area Historical Society's museum. |
| 20 | First Congregational Church of Zumbrota | First Congregational Church of Zumbrota | February 12, 1980 (#80002065) | 455 East Ave. 44°17′34″N 92°40′03″W | Zumbrota | One of southeast Minnesota's oldest standing churches, built in 1862, and a reflection of New Englander settlement in many of its towns. |
| 21 | Florence Town Hall | Florence Town Hall | July 20, 2000 (#00000818) | 33915 Minnesota Highway 61; 44°30′37″N 92°21′07″W | Frontenac | 1875 township hall, long-serving seat of government as well a social and recreational venue for the community. |
| 22 | Fort Sweeney Site | Fort Sweeney Site | August 5, 1970 (#70000295) | Address restricted | Red Wing vicinity | Distinctive hilltop site of pits, mounds, and other prehistoric earthworks on a projecting river bluff. |
| 23 | E.J. Fryk Barn | E.J. Fryk Barn | February 12, 1980 (#80002060) | 29212 Orchard Rd. 44°31′28″N 92°27′17″W | Red Wing vicinity | 1872 example of the small barns commonly built during the peak of cash crop wheat farming in southeast Minnesota. |
| 24 | Capt. Charles Gellett House | Capt. Charles Gellett House | February 12, 1980 (#80002042) | 311 N. 6th St. 44°30′34″N 92°54′30″W | Cannon Falls | 1860 house of a pioneer who helped develop hydropowered industry in Cannon Falls, and his brother-in-law, politician Joseph Peckham, who sponsored Minnesota's first state normal school. |
| 25 | Gladstone Building | Gladstone Building | November 14, 1979 (#79001239) | 309 Bush St. 44°33′54″N 92°32′01″W | Red Wing | Prominent 19th-century commercial building of local limestone, built in 1886. |
| 26 | Martin T. Gunderson House | Martin T. Gunderson House | June 10, 1975 (#75000980) | 107 Gunderson Blvd. 44°16′18″N 92°59′41″W | Kenyon | 1895 Queen Anne house of a local miller, the area's first industrialist, who introduced electric lighting to Kenyon. |
| 27 | Hauge Lutheran Church | Hauge Lutheran Church | February 12, 1980 (#80002048) | Off Minnesota Highway 60; 44°15′19″N 93°01′18″W | Kenyon vicinity | Church built 1871–1888 by a Hauge Synod congregation, one of the two primary Lutheran denominations behind Norwegian immigration into Goodhue County. |
| 28 | Ȟe Mni Caŋ-Barn Bluff Historic District | Ȟe Mni Caŋ-Barn Bluff Historic District | August 3, 1990 (#90001165) | Junction of U.S. 61 and 63; 44°34′10″N 92°31′32″W | Red Wing | 343-foot-high (105 m) bluff, a famous Mississippi River landmark from early European exploration into the automobile tourism era. Listing includes remnants of a 1929 staircase. A boundary increase and renaming was approved January 27, 2025. |
| 29 | Dr. Charles Hewitt Laboratory | Dr. Charles Hewitt Laboratory | November 15, 1979 (#79001240) | 216 Dakota St. 44°33′50″N 92°32′16″W | Red Wing | 1866 office/laboratory of Dr. Charles N. Hewitt (1836–1910), a national pioneer in public health. Also a contributing property to the Red Wing Residential Historic District. |
| 30 | Holden Lutheran Church Parsonage | Holden Lutheran Church Parsonage | February 12, 1980 (#80002049) | County Highway 60; 44°19′13″N 92°54′09″W | Kenyon vicinity | Parsonage where Reverend Bernt Julius Muus—a regional founder of the Norwegian Lutheran Church—lived c. 1861–1900, and where the progenitor of St. Olaf College was founded in 1869. |
| 31 | E.S. Hoyt House | E.S. Hoyt House | June 5, 1975 (#75000981) | 300 Hill St. 44°33′43″N 92°32′29″W | Red Wing | 1913 Prairie School house by Purcell & Elmslie, exemplifying the logistical and artistic unity of the architects' collaboration. Also a contributing property to the Red Wing Residential Historic District. |
| 32 | Immanuel Lutheran Church | Immanuel Lutheran Church | February 12, 1980 (#80002061) | 24686 Old Church Rd. 44°29′29″N 92°32′12″W | Hay Creek | 1897 church representative of regional German American settlement, southeast Minnesota's third-largest immigrant group after Swedes and Norwegians. |
| 33 | Kappel Wagon Works | Kappel Wagon Works | November 14, 1979 (#79001241) | 221 W. 3rd St. 44°33′58″N 92°31′57″W | Red Wing | Rare surviving example of Red Wing's early manufacturing businesses, constructed in 1875. Also noted for its architectural integrity. |
| 34 | Keystone Building | Keystone Building | November 14, 1979 (#79001242) | 409 Main St. 44°33′56″N 92°32′07″W | Red Wing | 1867 example of Red Wing's early commercial buildings, a rare surviving work of local architect Daniel C. Hill also noted for its Italianate architecture. |
| 35 | James L. Lawther House | James L. Lawther House | May 21, 1975 (#75000982) | 927 W. 3rd St. 44°33′43″N 92°32′27″W | Red Wing | Exemplary 1857 octagon house (expanded in 1870) of a notable local politician and real estate dealer. Also a contributing property to the Red Wing Residential Historic District. |
| 36 | Mendota to Wabasha Military Road: Cannon River Section | Mendota to Wabasha Military Road: Cannon River Section | February 7, 1991 (#90002199) | Cannon Bottom Rd. 44°34′48″N 92°38′36″W | Red Wing | 3,200-foot (980 m) road section conforming to the 1854 alignment of the Mendota–Wabasha Military Road, some of Minnesota's first transportation infrastructure. |
| 37 | Harrison Miller Farmhouse | Harrison Miller Farmhouse | May 22, 1978 (#78001535) | 2153 Minnesota Highway 19; 44°29′11″N 92°59′49″W | Cannon Falls vicinity | 1869 farmhouse noted for its transitional architecture blending Greek Revival, Gothic Revival, and Italianate elements. |
| 38 | John Miller Farmhouse | John Miller Farmhouse | February 12, 1980 (#80002062) | 11160 County Highway 1; 44°26′27″N 92°48′26″W | Cannon Falls vicinity | 1860s farmhouse with pattern features, exemplifying the prosperity of southeast Minnesota's early cash crop agriculture. Also associated with a prominent local farmer turned politician. |
| 39 | Minnesota State Training School | Minnesota State Training School | June 4, 1973 (#73000979) | 1079 County Highway 292; 44°33′38″N 92°29′52″W | Red Wing | Youth detention center complex dedicated in 1889, notable for its prominent Richardsonian Romanesque architecture and Minnesota's progressive stance on educating juvenile delinquents. Now the Minnesota Correctional Facility – Red Wing. |
| 40 | Minnesota Stoneware Company | Minnesota Stoneware Company | December 26, 1979 (#79001243) | 1997 W. Main St. 44°33′51″N 92°33′33″W | Red Wing | Stoneware factory complex dating to 1901, the only remaining buildings associated with Minnesota's nationally known Red Wing Pottery industry. Now Pottery Place mall. |
| 41 | Nansen Agricultural Historic District | Nansen Agricultural Historic District | November 15, 2000 (#00001372) | Vicinity of Minnesota Highway 56 and County Highways 14 and 49; 44°22′14″N 92°56′06″W | Holden and Warsaw Townships | 7.3-square-mile (19 km^{2}) agricultural district retaining its traditional infrastructure and land use since the 1870s, with 190 contributing properties on 30 family farms. |
| 42 | Oakwood Cemetery | Oakwood Cemetery | February 14, 2012 (#12000005) | 1258 Cherry St. 44°33′02″N 92°31′10″W | Red Wing | 1857 cemetery exemplifying the design principals of landscape architect Adolph Strauch and featuring a 1908 chapel and gate designed by Clarence H. Johnston, Sr. |
| 43 | Old Frontenac Historic District | Old Frontenac Historic District | June 4, 1973 (#73000978) | Roughly bounded by Winona Dr., Burr Oak St., and Lake and Westervelt Aves. 44°31′26″N 92°19′52″W | Florence Township | Early resort town preserving its 1857 layout, with 55 contributing properties charting its popularity from the steamboat era until the beginning of the 1950s. |
| 44 | Oxford Mill Ruin | Oxford Mill Ruin | February 12, 1980 (#80002044) | Oxford Mill Rd. 44°28′27″N 92°55′53″W | Cannon Falls vicinity | Ruins of an 1878 flour mill gutted by fire in 1905, the only standing remnant of a major Goodhue County industry and the best surviving example of a group of mills in the Cannon River Valley that pioneered several technological developments. |
| 45 | Pine Island City Hall and Fire Station | Pine Island City Hall and Fire Station | February 12, 1980 (#80002053) | 250 S. Main St. 44°12′02″N 92°38′48″W | Pine Island | 1909 government building representative of the multipurpose municipal facilities commonly built in southeastern Minnesota in the late 19th and early 20th centuries. |
| 46 | Pratt-Tabor House | Pratt-Tabor House | November 14, 1979 (#79001245) | 706 W. 4th St. 44°33′46″N 92°32′14″W | Red Wing | Brick Italianate house built c. 1875, a well-preserved example of a style popular during Red Wing's 1870s' prosperity. Also a contributing property to the Red Wing Residential Historic District. |
| 47 | Red Wing City Hall | Red Wing City Hall | November 14, 1979 (#79001246) | 315 W. 4th St. 44°33′53″N 92°31′55″W | Red Wing | Municipal hall built 1905–06, noted as Red Wing's only government building constructed exclusively for city use, and for its Renaissance Revival architecture. |
| 48 | Red Wing Iron Works | Red Wing Iron Works | November 14, 1979 (#79001247) | 401 Levee St. 44°33′59″N 92°32′11″W | Red Wing | Red Wing's oldest surviving industrial building, an 1874 ironworks whose supply and repair of local machinery was key to the city's rise as an early manufacturing center. |
| 49 | Red Wing Mall Historic District | Red Wing Mall Historic District | January 8, 1980 (#80002063) | Along East and West Aves. and Broadway between 6th St. and the levee 44°33′47″N 92°32′06″W | Red Wing | Long-serving and unusually large civic district, with 48 contributing properties including public buildings, parks, churches, and the 1905 Red Wing Depot. |
| 50 | Red Wing Residential Historic District | Red Wing Residential Historic District | April 15, 1982 (#82002955) | Roughly bounded by W. 5th, W. Main, Cedar, and Dakota Sts. 44°33′40″N 92°32′26″W | Red Wing | 14-block housing district significant for its influential residents—including Eric Norelius, William J. Colvill, and Frances Densmore—and variety of period architectural styles, with 153 contributing properties built 1855–1935. |
| 51 | Red Wing Waterworks | Red Wing Waterworks | August 13, 2013 (#13000598) | 935 Levee Rd. 44°33′52″N 92°32′34″W | Red Wing | Water supply complex dating to 1885, Red Wing's oldest surviving city public works facility. |
| 52 | Roscoe Butter and Cheese Factory | Roscoe Butter and Cheese Factory | February 12, 1980 (#80002054) | 13130 County Highway 11; 44°13′30″N 92°46′08″W | Roscoe | 1898 example of the small, rural, late-19th-century factories established to serve southeast Minnesota's emerging dairy industry. Also associated with the agricultural cooperative movement. |
| 53 | T.B. Sheldon Memorial Auditorium | T.B. Sheldon Memorial Auditorium | June 3, 1976 (#76001054) | 443 W. 3rd St. 44°33′50″N 92°32′06″W | Red Wing | Long-serving cultural venue built in 1904, donated to the city as the first municipal theatre in the United States. Also a contributing property to the Red Wing Mall Historic District. |
| 54 | Theodore B. Sheldon House | Theodore B. Sheldon House | June 7, 1976 (#76001055) | 805 W. 4th St. 44°33′42″N 92°32′17″W | Red Wing | 1875 house of Theodore B. Sheldon (1820–1900), an early settler of Red Wing who arrived in 1856 and became one of the city's leading citizens, active in commerce, transportation, and civics. Also a contributing property to the Red Wing Residential Historic District. |
| 55 | Spring Creek Petroglyphs | Spring Creek Petroglyphs | November 14, 1996 (#96001310) | Address restricted | Red Wing vicinity | Native American petroglyph panel with bird, snake, and human glyphs. Also designated 21GD187. |
| 56 | St. James Hotel | St. James Hotel | September 15, 1977 (#77000733) | 406 Main St. 44°33′58″N 92°32′08″W | Red Wing | Prominent and long-serving hotel designed by Edward Bassford and built 1874–75. Listing expanded to two adjacent commercial buildings, including an early medical clinic, built by the hotel in 1912 and 1923 to diversify. |
| 57 | Third Street Bridge | Third Street Bridge | November 6, 1989 (#89001836) | 3rd St. over the Cannon River; 44°30′49″N 92°54′15″W | Cannon Falls | Uncommon example of a Pennsylvania truss bridge, built 1909–10 by notable bridge contractor A.Y. Bayne and engineering firm Loweth & Wolff. |
| 58 | Towne-Akenson House | Towne-Akenson House | November 15, 1979 (#79001248) | 1121 W. 3rd St. 44°33′40″N 92°32′36″W | Red Wing | Red Wing's best preserved example—built in 1875—of the frame Italianate houses built during its 1870s' prosperity. Also a contributing property to the Red Wing Residential Historic District. |
| 59 | Vasa Historic District | Vasa Historic District | May 30, 1975 (#75000983) | Off Minnesota Highway 19; 44°30′15″N 92°43′01″W | Vasa | Minnesota's most intact Swedish American settlement, established in 1853. 19 contributing properties include a museum housed in the town's original 1861 church. |
| 60 | Fred Wallauer Farmhouse | Fred Wallauer Farmhouse | February 12, 1980 (#80004593) | 2602 Minnesota 58; 44°31′49″N 92°31′27″W | Red Wing vicinity | 1882 Italianate farmhouse reflecting the prosperity achieved by many southeast Minnesota farmers in the latter 19th century. |
| 61 | Yale Hardware Store | Yale Hardware Store | February 12, 1980 (#80002045) | 139 N. 4th St. 44°30′28″N 92°54′20″W | Cannon Falls | 1887 Italianate hardware store, representing one of the key agricultural center businesses serving surrounding farmers. Also a contributing property to the Cannon Falls Commercial Historic District. |
| 62 | Darwin E. Yale House | Darwin E. Yale House | February 12, 1980 (#80002046) | 421 N. 6th St. 44°30′39″N 92°54′28″W | Cannon Falls | 1879 Italianate house reflecting the prosperity and importance of a local hardware merchant. |
| 63 | Zumbrota Covered Bridge | Zumbrota Covered Bridge | February 20, 1975 (#75000984) | West Ave. over the North Fork of the Zumbro River; 44°17′47″N 92°40′13″W | Zumbrota | Last surviving example of Minnesota's few covered bridges, built in 1869. Now the centerpiece of a public park. |

== Former listings ==
| | Name on the Register | Image | Date listed | Date removed | Location | City or town | Description |
|---|---|---|---|---|---|---|---|
| 1 | Just C. Gronvold House | | April 23, 1973 (#73000977) | June 23, 1993 | County Highway 8 | Kenyon | 1873 Gothic Revival house. Moved in 1991. |
| 2 | Dr. Orrin I. Hall House | Dr. Orrin I. Hall House | February 12, 1980 (#80002066) | May 17, 2000 | 206 W. 3rd St. (original address); Current coordinates are 44°37′54″N 92°50′02″W | Zumbrota | 1884 house of southern Goodue County's leading physician (1843–1908). Moved to the Little Log House Pioneer Village in Hastings, Minnesota, in 2000. |
| 3 | Kenyon Opera House | | February 12, 1980 (#80002047) | October 6, 1995 | Main St. | Kenyon | 1890 Italianate theater. Demolished in 1994. |
| 4 | Julia B. Nelson House | | November 15, 1979 (#79001244) | December 8, 2004 | 219 5th St. | Red Wing | Circa-1880 boardinghouse of an educator and social cause advocate. Demolished in 2004. |
| 5 | Roscoe Store | | February 12, 1980 (#80002055) | August 2, 2000 | County Highway 11 | Pine Island vicinity | 1907 department store. Demolished in the late 1990s. |
| 6 | Wanamingo Township Hall | | February 12, 1980 (#80002064) | July 17, 1993 | County Highway 1 (original address); Current coordinates are 44°19′40″N 92°52′19″W | Wanamingo vicinity | 1860 town hall. Moved across the street in 1990. |

== See also ==
- List of National Historic Landmarks in Minnesota
- National Register of Historic Places listings in Minnesota
