= Dammon Round Barn =

- U.S. National Register of Historic Places
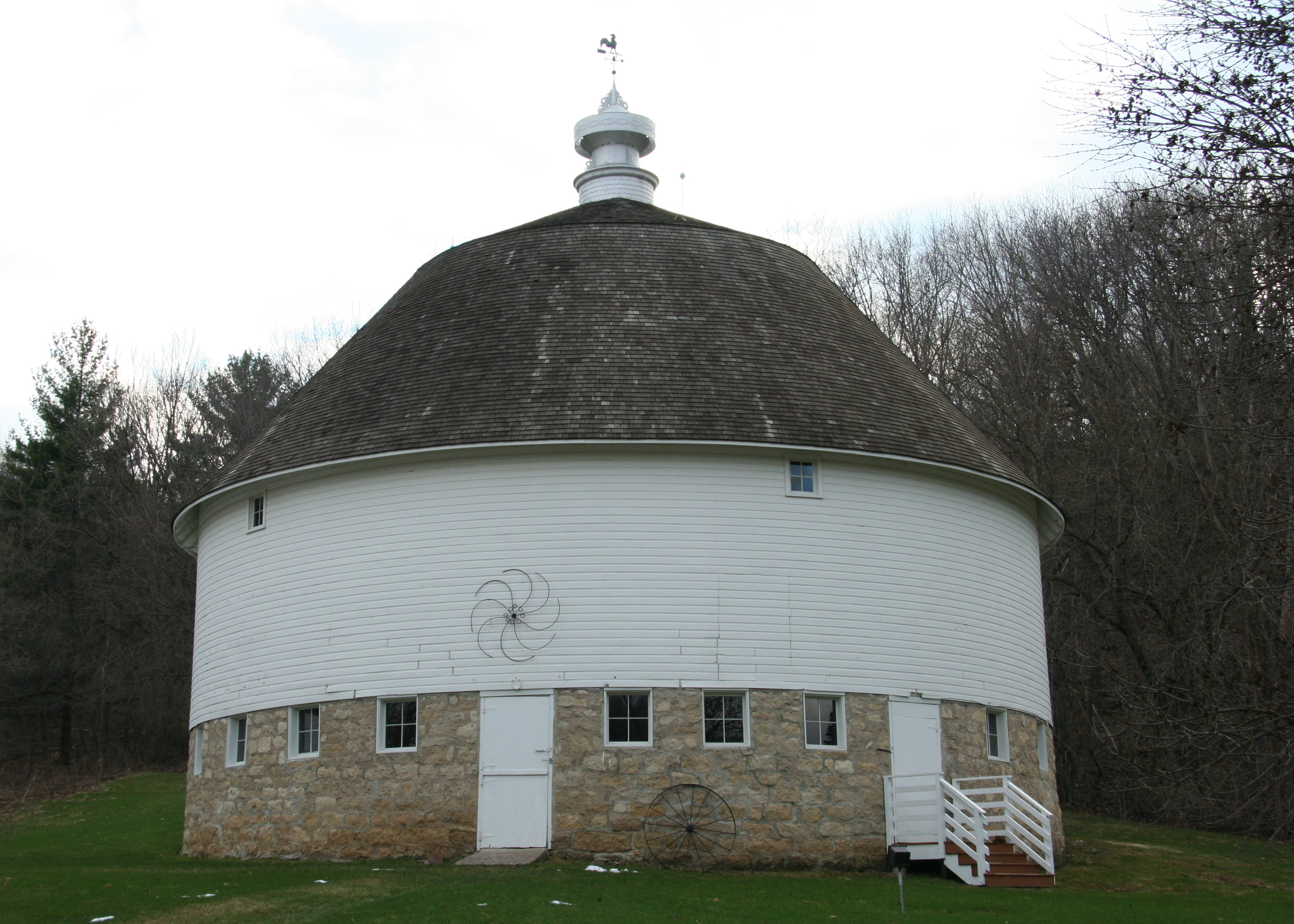

- Location within Minnesota Location within the United States
- Location: Wacouta Township, Goodhue County, Minnesota, USA
- Nearest city: Red Wing, Minnesota
- Coordinates: 44°32′49″N 92°27′36″W
- Built: 1914
- Architect: Oliver Landick
- MPS: Rural Goodhue County MRA
- NRHP reference No.: 80002058
- Added to NRHP: February 12, 1980

Dammon Round Barn is a round barn just southeast of Red Wing, Minnesota, United States, adjacent to U.S. Route 61. The barn is listed on the National Register of Historic Places. It was built in 1914, with a foundation of Mississippi River limestone, and is 60 feet (18 m) in diameter and 60 feet (18 m) high. It was built during a time of agricultural growth in Goodhue County, when dairy cow herds were averaging 25 cows per farm and farmers were starting to build specialized barns. The round barn design was built around a silo and provided insulation for the silage, as well as making feeding and cleaning easier. Despite their efficiency round barns were difficult to construct, and they were not widely adopted. Later in its history the barn was used for honey production of the beekeeping owners of the farm. In 2000 the farm was purchased by Robin and Elaine Kleffman and the Dammon Barn underwent some significant restoration. A straightening of the walls and replacement of the original pillars for the upper floor support and a leveling and new installation of a floor in the top level of the barn makes this one of the most premiere remaining round barns in Minnesota. In 2017 this historic barn wedding venue was purchased by Kirk and Wendy Stensrud. It has become integral as a MN wedding venue in Red Wing. The second floor hayloft now serves as a dance floor for weddings from May through October each year.

In the book Minnesota's Round Barns by John Roscoe (Lakeside Press, Inc 2019) it is written that only 48 Round Barns remain in existence in Minnesota. Roscoe's book documents and preserves the existence and distinct type of barns in our nation's history.

The barn is now part of a bed and breakfast and a top Minnesota Wedding Venue. The 8,000-square-foot (740 m^{2}) facility is available as a venue for Minnesota weddings.

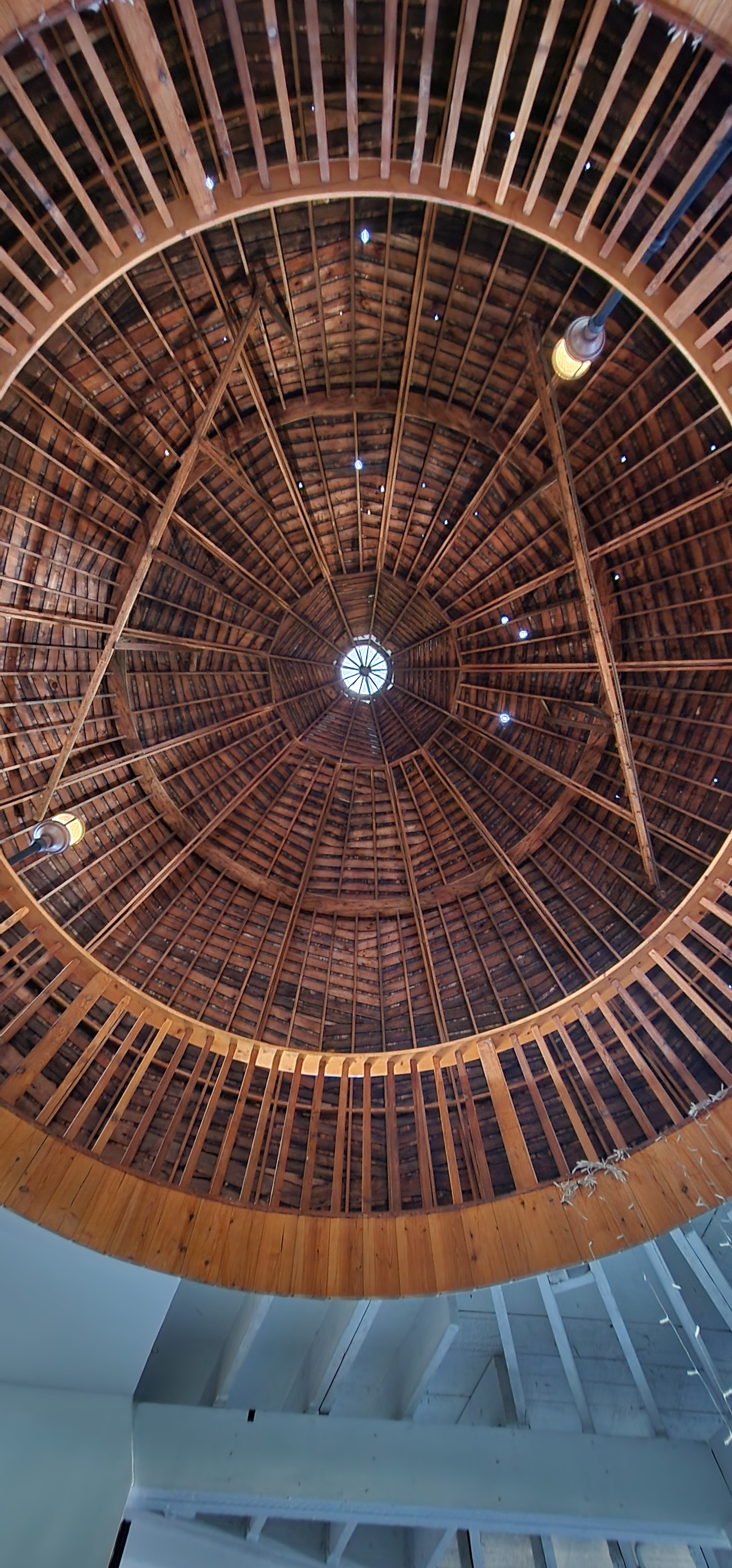
MN Wedding Venue in Red Wing Ceiling 2024

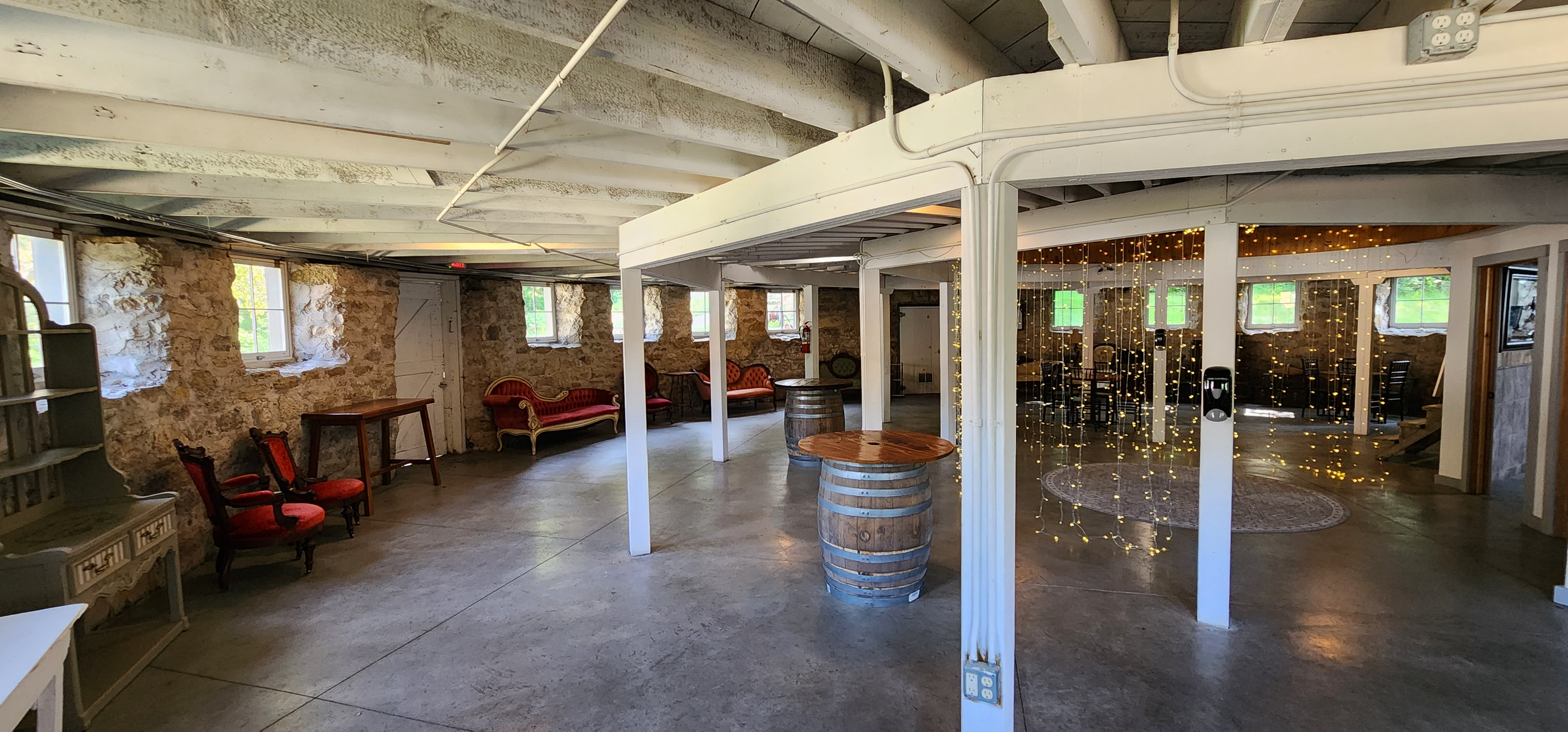
MN Wedding Venue in Red Wing ground floor 2024

== See also ==
- List of round barns
- National Register of Historic Places listings in Goodhue County, Minnesota
