= Wacouta, Minnesota =

Unincorporated community in Minnesota, United States

Wacouta
- Unincorporated community
- Location within Minnesota Location within the United States
- Coordinates: 44°32′42″N 92°26′06″W
- Country: United States
- State: Minnesota
- County: Goodhue
- Township: Wacouta
- Elevation: 715 ft (218 m)
- Time zone: UTC-6 (Central (CST))
  - Summer (DST): UTC-5 (CDT)
- ZIP code: 55066
- Area code: 651
- GNIS feature ID: 653706

Wacouta is an unincorporated community in Wacouta Township, Goodhue County, Minnesota, United States.

The community is located southeast of Red Wing along Highways 61 and 63. Bullard Creek flows through the community, with the Mississippi River and Lake Pepin located nearby.

Nearby places include Red Wing, Frontenac, Hay Creek, and Lake City.

== Transportation ==
Amtrak’s Empire Builder, which operates between Seattle/Portland and Chicago, passes through the town on BNSF tracks, but makes no stop. The nearest station is located in Red Wing, 6 miles (9.7 km) to the northwest.
