= Red Wing Shoes =

American company

Red Wing Shoe Company, LLC

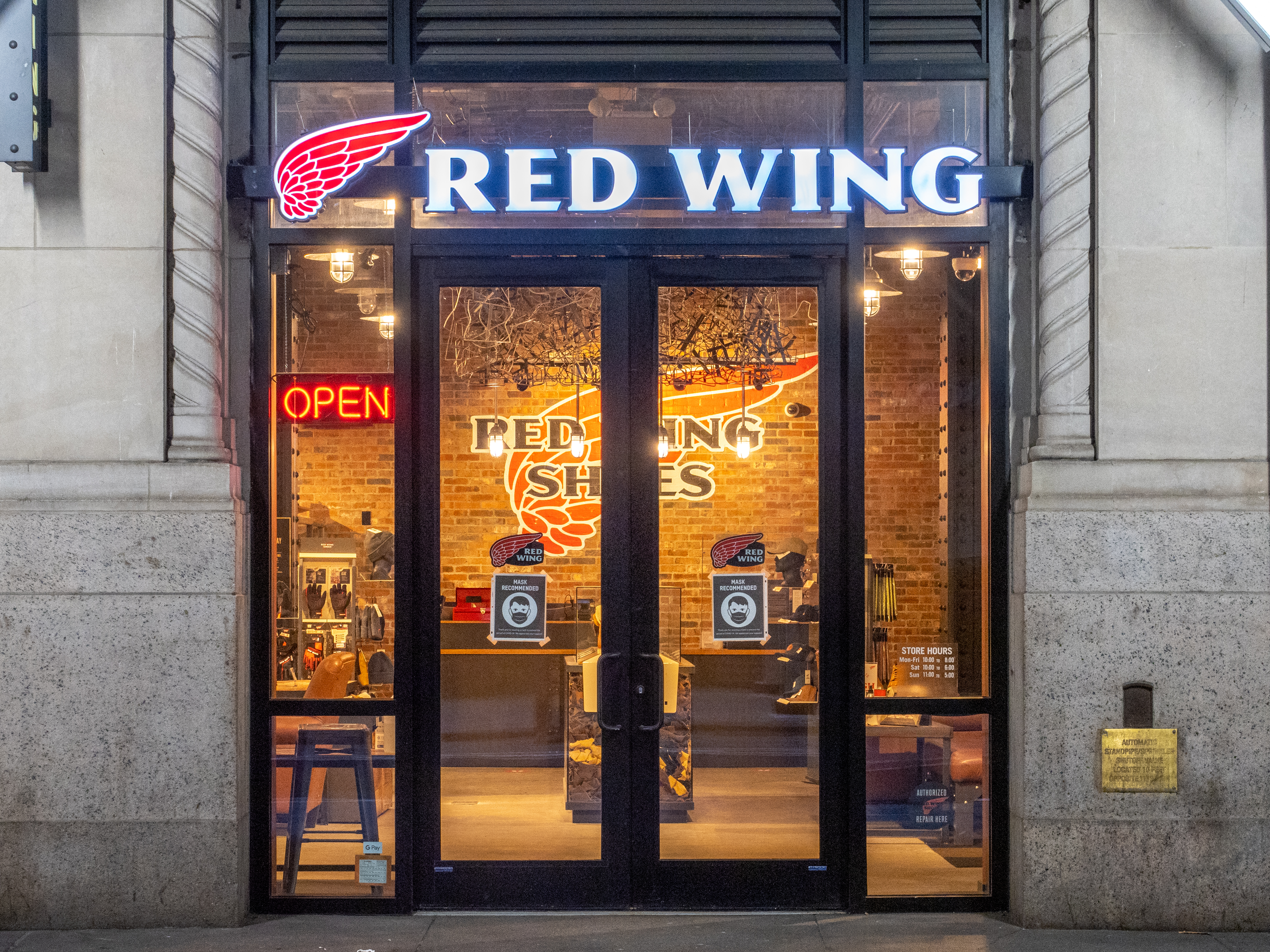
- Red Wing store, Manhattan
- Type: Private
- Industry: Footwear
- Founded: 1905; 121 years ago
- Founder: Charles H. Beckman
- Headquarters: Red Wing, Minnesota, U.S.
- Products: Work boots; work shoes; casual boots; accessories
- Website: redwingshoes.com

Red Wing Shoes (Red Wing Shoe Company, LLC) is an American footwear company based in Red Wing, Minnesota. The company was founded by Charles H. Beckman in 1905.

== Products ==
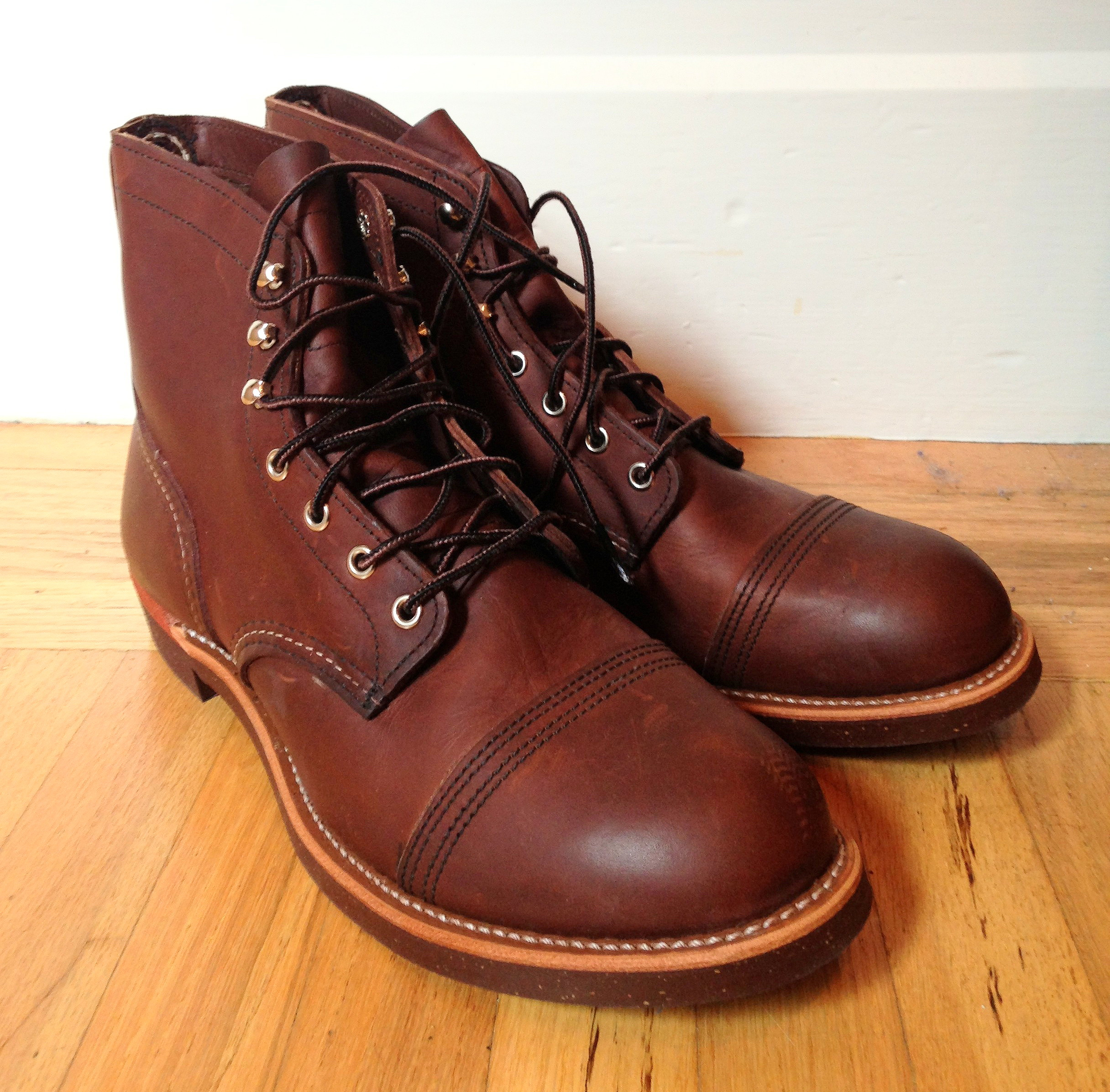
The Iron Ranger is among the most well known models.

The company produces Oxfords, chukkas, hiking boots, and logger styles, as well as work boots. In 1977 they started producing urethane soled boots for improved comfort. While the core of Red Wing's focus is on work boots, in 2008 Red Wing Shoes added a Heritage catalog and also has experimented with more fashion-oriented shoes.

In 2024, Red Wing offered to stitch "wills" into the tongue of boots purchased, as part of a "Will your Wings" campaign.

== Manufacturing ==
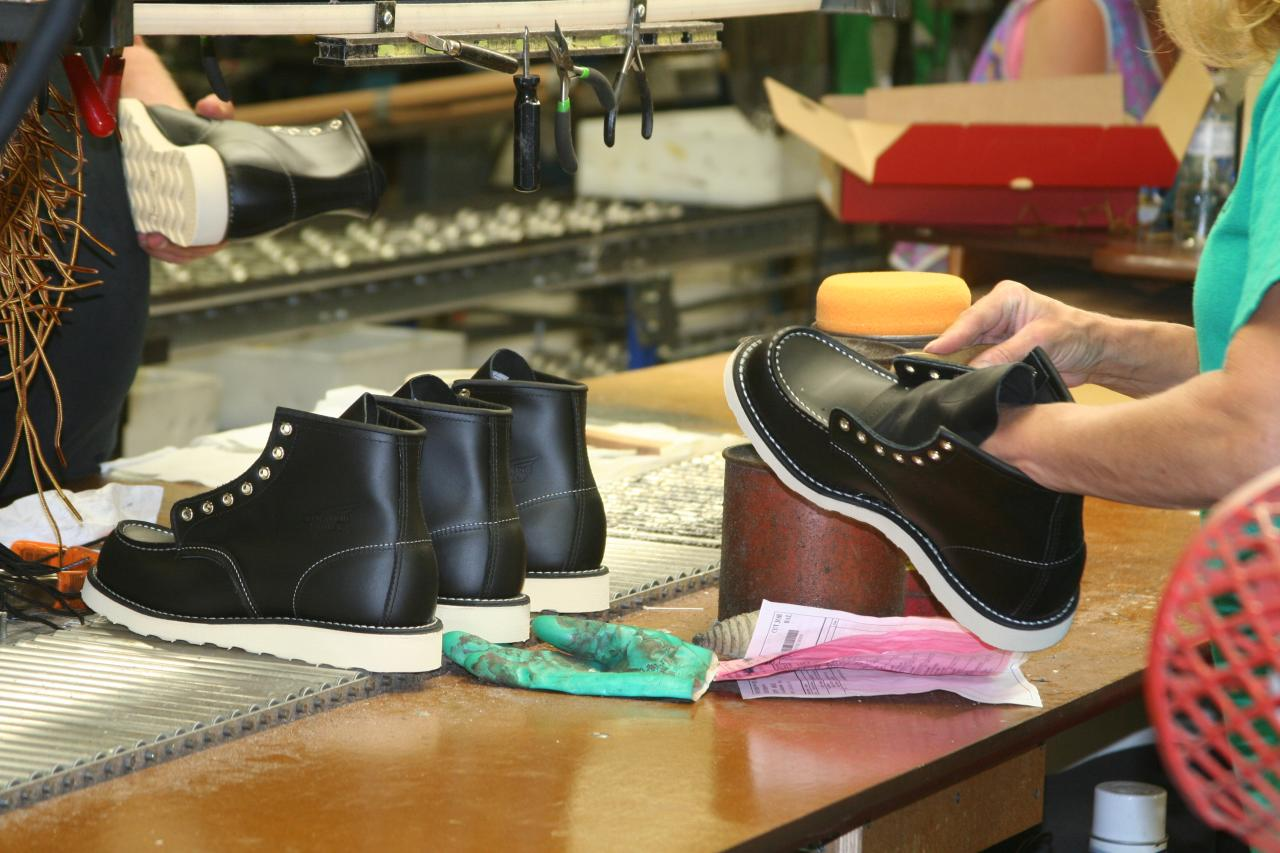
Moc Toe boots being made at a Red Wing Shoes factory in the U.S.

The Red Wing Shoe brand is primarily handmade in the USA with American materials at the company's plants in Red Wing, Minnesota, and Potosi, Missouri. They also manufactured shoes in a Danville, Kentucky, factory, until its closure in June 2010. As of 2014, there are six sources of manufacture: completely made in the USA, made in the USA with imported materials, assembled in the USA with imported components, made in China, made in Korea, and made in Vietnam.

In addition to manufacturing footwear under their own name, Red Wing Shoes also manufactures shoes under the Irish Setter Boots, Vasque (discontinued in 2024), Carhartt (discontinued in 2011), and Worx brands. These other Red Wing brands include a majority of models manufactured in Vietnam and Cambodia. In order to comply with ASTM F 2413-11 and M I/75 C/75 standards for impact and compression, Red Wing Shoes manufactures many of their styles with steel, non-metallic, and aluminum safety toes and offers puncture-resistant options that meet the ASTM F 2413-11 standard. Red Wing Shoes also produces footwear that is static-dissipative in order to control the amount of electrical discharge from the body and electrical hazard in order to provide extra protection from accidental contact with electrically energized objects.

== Safety issues ==
In 2013, Red Wing Shoes recalled over 114,000 pairs of steel toe boots due to defective toe caps that could fail to protect wearers' feet.

== See also ==
- St. James Hotel (Red Wing, Minnesota), hotel owned by Red Wing Shoes
- S. B. Foot Tanning Company, leather tannery owned by Red Wing Shoes
