= Mendota–Wabasha Military Road =

- Mendota to Wabasha Military Road: Cannon River Section
- U.S. National Register of Historic Places
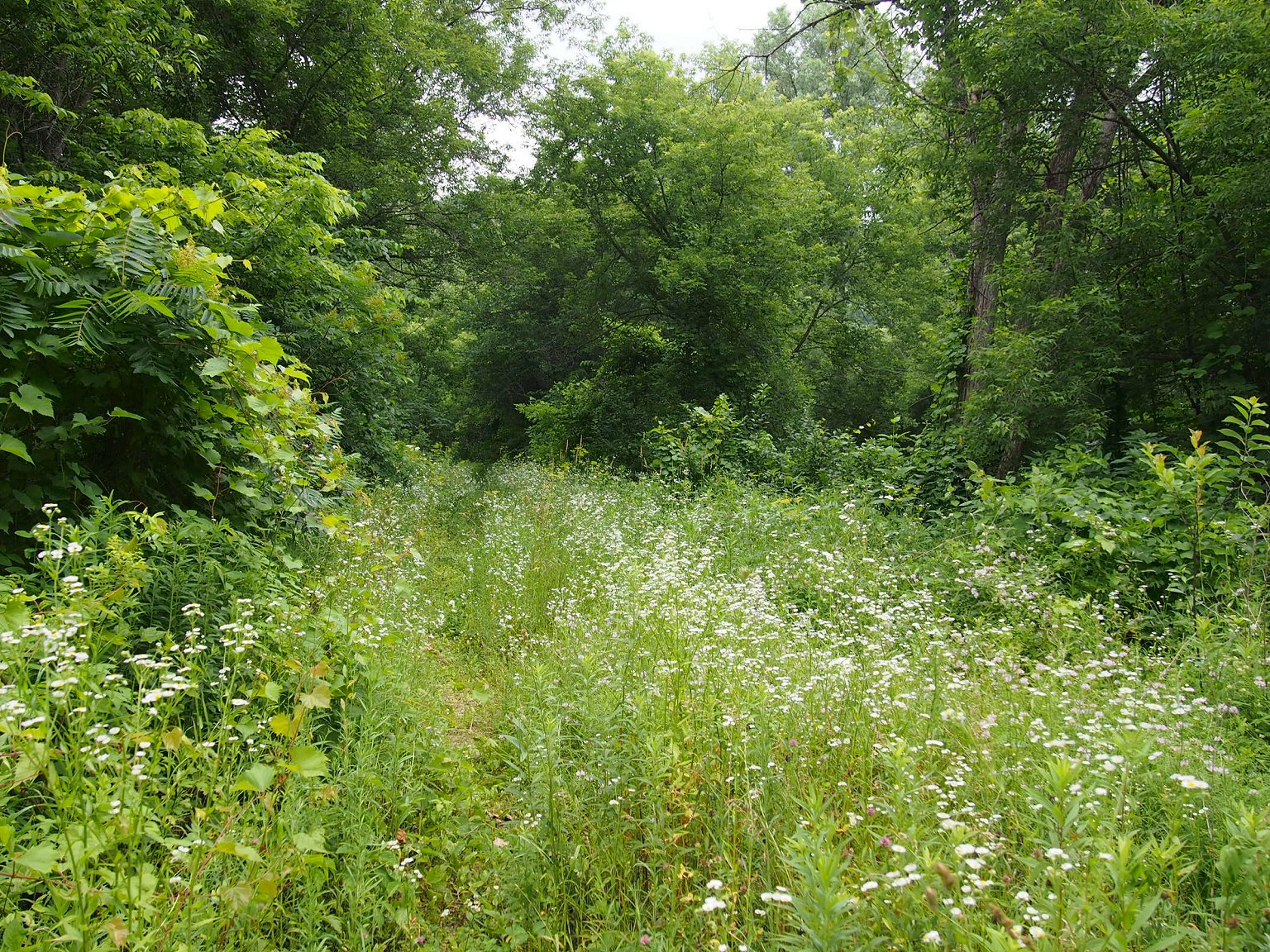
- Part of the Mendota to Wabasha Military Road: Cannon River Section

- Location within Minnesota Location within the United States
- Location: Cannon Bottom Road, Red Wing, Minnesota
- Coordinates: 44°34′48″N 92°38′36″W
- Area: 4.8 acres (1.9 ha)
- Built: 1854
- Architect: Multiple
- Architectural style: Gravel road
- MPS: Minnesota Military Roads MPS
- NRHP reference No.: 90002199
- Added to NRHP: February 7, 1991

The Mendota to Wabasha Military Road, Cannon River Section is a 3,200-foot-long (980 m) fragment of a road in Red Wing in the U.S. state of Minnesota. The road once stretched from Mendota to Wabasha and was planned in the earliest years of Minnesota Territory before Minnesota became a state. This particular fragment of road, which spans the Cannon River bottomlands, was listed on the National Register of Historic Places in 1991. It was listed as part of a statewide survey that identified historic fragments of the military wagon roads built between 1850 and 1861. The survey found that a road fragment could be considered historic if it was unpaved, that it is "long enough to evoke a sense of destination" where an observer at one end could not see the other end, and that the setting of the road had not been intruded upon with recent buildings or roads.

When Minnesota became a territory in 1849, Henry Hastings Sibley lobbied the United States Congress for aid for building roads. Congress had supported road building in other territories, and they approved the Minnesota request for the purposes of defense, for benefit of the settlers, and to increase the value of the public lands to be sold to settlers. The Minnesota Road Act of July 1850 appropriated $40,000 to construct four military wagon roads and to survey a fifth. Of that, $5,000 was allocated for a road from Mendota to Wabasha, on the west bank of the Mississippi River. The Mendota to Wabasha road was surveyed and marked by the Corps of Topographical Engineers in 1851 and 1853, but work on the section at the Cannon River did not begin until after 1854, when money was available to build a causeway and a main bridge across the river bottoms. Captain James H. Simpson contracted with Thomas J. Frazier in December 1854 to build a 150-foot (46 m) truss bridge, which was finished by September 1855. Simpson also contracted with the firm of Mason and Whipple to build the causeway and a couple smaller bridges, but they were unable to complete the contract. C.R. Read, of Reads Landing, was therefore brought in to finish the job, which was done by the end of 1856.

The main Cannon River bridge was damaged by flooding in 1856, and the 1857 federal appropriation only provided $2,000 for repairs, although Captain George Thom insisted that repairs would cost $3,000. The Goodhue County Commissioners repaired the bridge. There were no further federal appropriations after 1857, and the military road program came to an end four years later. Burnside Township and the county assumed maintenance of the road at that point.

In 1898 the Minnesota Constitution was amended so the state could fund road construction and other internal improvements. The Minnesota Legislature passed a bill allowing county boards to designate state roads and receive tax funding. The section of road crossing the Cannon River, known as Cannon Bottom Road, was designated State Road 3. With tax revenue available, the county constructed new bridges in 1911 and 1915, and they regraded and graveled the road in 1919. In 1920, a constitutional amendment established a state trunk highway system, and State Road 3 became Trunk Highway 3. A new bridge over the Cannon River was built in 1921. The Minnesota Highway Commissioner found fault with the road's alignment, though, so a completely new alignment was constructed to the west in 1931. This section of road, now part of U.S. Highway 61, shortened the distance by 0.35 miles (0.56 km) and is still in use today. The old road reverted to the jurisdiction of Burnside Township, which was subsequently annexed by the city of Red Wing in 1971.

The section listed on the National Register begins at a junction with Collischan Road on the north river bank. It runs to the southeast, away from the bluffs, and crosses the Cannon River on the 1921 concrete-girder bridge. The National Register-listed section then continues for 3,000 feet (910 m) on a causeway, with two bridges measuring about 93 feet (28 m) each, built in 1911 and 1915. The listed section ends at an intersection with the Cannon Valley Trail, formerly the Chicago Great Western Railroad, and then continues on as Cannon Bottom Road, a signed city street. As of 2015 the northern, 1915 bridge has been removed.

== See also ==
- National Register of Historic Places listings in Goodhue County, Minnesota
