= Sheldon Theatre =

- T.B. Sheldon Memorial Auditorium
- U.S. National Register of Historic Places
- U.S. Historic district – Contributing property
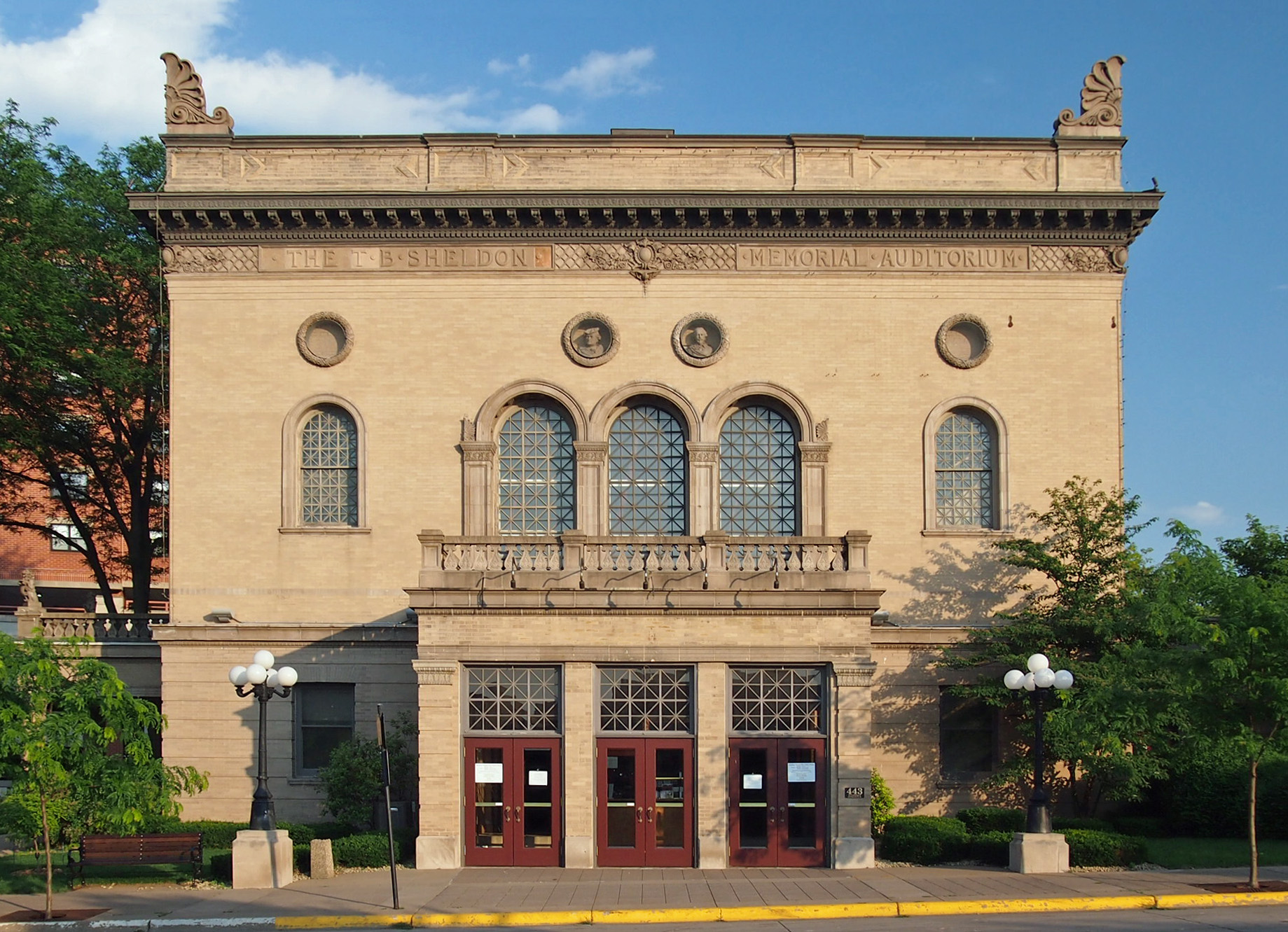
- The front of the Sheldon Theatre from the northwest

- Location within Minnesota Location within the United States
- Location: 443 West 3rd Street, Red Wing, Minnesota
- Coordinates: 44°33′50″N 92°32′6″W
- Area: Less than one acre
- Built: 1904
- Architect: Lowell Lamoreaux
- Architectural style: Renaissance Revival
- Part of: Red Wing Mall Historic District (ID80002063)
- NRHP reference No.: 76001054

Significant dates
- Added to NRHP: June 3, 1976
- Designated CP: January 8, 1980

The Sheldon Theatre is a historic performance venue in Red Wing, Minnesota, United States, built in 1904. It was listed on the National Register of Historic Places in 1976 as the T.B. Sheldon Memorial Auditorium for having local significance in the theme of performing arts. It was nominated for being the first municipally owned theatre in the United States and a long-standing cultural venue in Red Wing. It later became a contributing property to the Red Wing Mall Historic District as well.

== History ==
In 1856, Massachusetts businessman Theodore B. Sheldon moved to Red Wing with his first wife, Mary. Sheldon was very prominent in the small, growing town of Red Wing. He first joined Jesse McIntire and established himself in the mercantile business. Sheldon was involved with numerous other industries in Red Wing, including grain, banks, railroads, stoneware, and gas and power. Most prominently, he and McIntire established Red Wing's First National Bank in 1865. Sheldon also unified the Bluff and Diamond flour mills to establish Red Wing Mills, which have been described as the pride of Red Wing.

When Sheldon died in 1900, his will required that half of his estate be used for a public, nonsectarian purpose in the town of Red Wing. On March 3, 1903, Sheldon's trustees proposed the idea of T.B. Sheldon Memorial Auditorium, and the city council approved it. Eighteen months later, the new theater stood on the corner of Third Street and East Avenue. It was managed by the city of Red Wing.

The theater opened on October 10, 1904, with a performance of the light comic opera The Royal Chef. The opening ceremonies also included a performance by the Rossiter Orchestra from Minneapolis.

From the beginning, some feared that the theater would have a demoralizing effect on the town. During opening night, several seats were left vacant in protest. In the 1920s, Red Wing church groups took their concerns to the city council. They petitioned, unsuccessfully, for greater censorship and for Sunday shows to be discontinued.

The theater was originally used for live performances. It primarily showed lighter fare, like musical comedies, and romantic dramas. In 1911 the theater began projecting silent movies. After a fire in 1918, the theater was refurbished by the original architecture firm, overseen by Lowell Lamoreaux. Among the improvements was a movie projection box. The theater re-opened with a viewing of the movie Tom Sawyer, which signaled its shift away from live theater and towards film.

During the 1920s and 1930s, the theater became a popular and profitable movie house. Red Wing was fortunate not to suffer considerably during the Great Depression. In 1929, the theater began showing sound movies or "talkies". It was remodeled in 1936 to improve the visuals and acoustics for showing films.

The auditorium began to experience trouble in the 1950s. A nationwide slump in moviegoing slowed its profits, and unwise investments in improvements sunk its funds. The theater was further threatened in 1957, when John Wright brought two lawsuits against it. Wright, the owner of a competing theater, alleged that the city had an unfair advantage over private entrepreneurs. He also filed suit to argue that a movie theater was not "public" and the auditorium was therefore in violation of Sheldon's trust.

In 1958 the Minnesota Supreme Court ordered the auditorium to quit the movie business. The theater's board found a way around the ruling, however, by leasing the theater to James Fraser. Fraser had been the theater's manager, and he continued to show movies there. In 1960 the Minnesota Supreme Court handed down its final decision, which was unanimously in favor of the auditorium.

Poor management caused continued financial problems for the theater in the 1970s and 1980s. In 1984 the board established a task force to raise money to restore the theater. The restored theater re-opened in 1988. The theater projected its last movie in May 1988, but it continued to host live entertainment. In 2012 the auditorium was offering a range of live programming that included both highbrow and middlebrow events.

== Performing Arts Theatre ==
The theater has a theatre organ, made by Kilgen.

== See also ==
- National Register of Historic Places listings in Goodhue County, Minnesota
