= S. B. Foot Tanning Company =

S.B. Foot Tanning Company is a leather production facility located in Red Wing, Minnesota. It processes leather for use in the crafting of shoes, boots, belts, and leather accessories. In 2010, the factory processed nearly 6 million linear feet of hides. S.B. Foot Tanning Company is a wholly owned subsidiary of Red Wing Shoes Company, Inc. and is the principal supplier of leather to its shoe manufacturing plants. The company also supplies over 1.5 million linear feet of leather for use in the production of military footwear per year, extending a tradition that began with World War I, when the tannery supplied boot leathers for the construction of soldier boots.

== Processing ==
Hides are sourced from Feedlot cattle raised on ranches in Nebraska and Texas which are then run through primary processing in Minnesota and Iowa. The tannery then purchases the pre-processed hides which arrive in a stage of production called "Wet Blue," a term applied to animal hides that have been cured in Chromium salts. Wet-Blue hides produce stable leather products that are durable and flexible; and are able to maintain these characteristics over time.

Upon arrival, the hides are graded based on the overall thickness and quality of the hide. Once graded, hides are grouped and shaved to a specific thickness. Once a hide has passed through the shaver, it will be more uniform and ready for color tanning.

S.B. Foot Tanning Company uses wood drums measuring up to 40 feet in diameter. Wood drums are preferred over steel mainly due to heat absorbing properties. The hides are spun in a float of chemicals and dyes, mostly consisting of oils distilled from different tree barks and vegetation, to stain the hides to desired color. The longer a hide is spun in the barrel, the more time the dyes and oils have to seep into the cells and fibers of the leather. Most of the leather processed will spin long enough for the dyes to fully penetrate the hides.

The hides are then dried, removing nearly 90% of the water weight from the hides. Some hides are then processed through additional steps: adding oils, waxes and possibly additional color tone finishes to achieve the desired look and properties.

S.B. Foot Tanning Company then packages the hides for shipment to different production facilities. It is estimated that Red Wing Shoe Company uses nearly half of the total shoe leather produced.

== Environmental concerns ==
Tanneries process animal skins with the use of chemicals to alter the proteins and produce a durable and flexible product. Whether the tanning process is done using vegetable tanning, chromium salt tanning or another process, solid and water waste are inevitable by-products.

Currently, all hides used by S.B. Foot Tanning Company are pre-processed to a “wet-blue” state prior to delivery to the tannery for final tanning and dying. The three stages of Wet-Blue processing (pretanning, tanning, finishing) produce 450–600 kg of waste per ton of processed leather. The treatment of this waste is governed by EPA rules and regulations.

Of this waste, nearly half can be reprocessed or recycled. Lime split can be sold as collagen (25-30% reduction in total waste), waste water treatment solids can be processed and resold as soil fertilizer (10% reduction) and trimmings can be collected and re-packaged for use in making bonded leather products (5% reduction).

A second by-product is waste water. 35 m^3 of waste water per ton of raw hide is the average. The highest amount of waste water is produced in the pretanning process as hides are fleshed and split – removing any hair or animal debris from the hide. The process used by S.B. Foot Tanning Company and the Wet Blue facilities they source their hides from report a waste water impact of 28 m^3 per ton.

Precipitation techniques and fluid-reuse has reduced the total amount of solid and water waste produced. High-exhaustion tanning processes have reduced the use of Chromium salts by 33% and increased the chrome utilization from 70% to 98%, resulting in reduction of chrome discharge (waste) from 3.8 kg/t to 0.05-0.1 kg/t.

Further developments in alternative pre-tanning processes and precipitation recovery/re-use of chemicals continue to be developed.

== History ==
The company has been in near-continuous operation since 1872 and is the namesake of Silas Buck Foot (S.B. Foot).

The original business was built along the shores of Trout Brook in Featherstone Township, just outside Red Wing, MN. The tannery was built to supply the Foot, Schulze & Co's demand for reliable hides that could be fashioned into furry moccasins called "shoe pacs," a popular shoe of the time with local farmers and outdoor workers.

In the Cash Panic of 1893, the tannery managed to continue daily operations and pay its workers by issuing scrips reading “In 60 days we promise to pay to the order of bearer the sum of $5.00.” This tender was treated as cash and accepted by local merchants without discount. The tannery made good on these scrips, redeeming all outstanding scrip in due time.

In April, 1897, the company was renamed and S.B. Foot & Company was formally incorporated. S. B. Foot turned over management of the tannery's daily business to his son, Edwin Hawley Foot (E. H. Foot) in 1898. In the early 1900s, the tannery buildings had become a liability - they needed to be rebuilt. S.B. Foot tried, unsuccessfully, to sell the tannery.

E.H.’s enthusiasm in running the tannery business changed S.B. Foot’s mind and a decision was made to build a new factory. With $250,000 being raised from local Red Wing residents and another $250,000 coming from the Foot family's own finances to help start construction of the new factory in early 1908. Silas Buck Foot would pass away in May of that year – leaving the business entirely in the control of E.H. Foot.

The company survived the Great Depression, re-organizing as S.B. Foot Tanning Company in the winter of 1932-33.

E.H. Foot died July 4, 1957, 100 years after his father had originally arrived in Red Wing. Silas B. Foot II, E.H. Foot's eldest son, then presided over the company until 1972 when E.H. Jr., brother to S.B. Foot II, became president. Silas B. Foot III, the fourth generation of the Foot Family to preside over the business, would become president prior to selling the business to the Red Wing Shoe Company in 1986.

Red Wing Shoe Company continues to operate the tannery today.

=== Silas Buck Foot ===
Silas Buck Foot (S.B. Foot) was a farmer, inventor and shoemaker who had moved to Minnesota from Pennsylvania in 1857. At this time, Red Wing, Minnesota was a booming hub of Goodhue County, situated on the shores of the Mississippi River with favorable portage and proximity to wheat supplies and the mills in Minneapolis.

S. B. was an active member in the local church, fraternal societies and municipal projects, he “became the president of the Red Wing and Iowa Railroad Company in 1881, hoping to build and operate a railroad from the Great Lakes shipping port of Duluth, through Red Wing, to the agricultural and coal mining region of Iowa.”
