= Wacouta Township, Goodhue County, Minnesota =

Wacouta Township, Minnesota
- Township
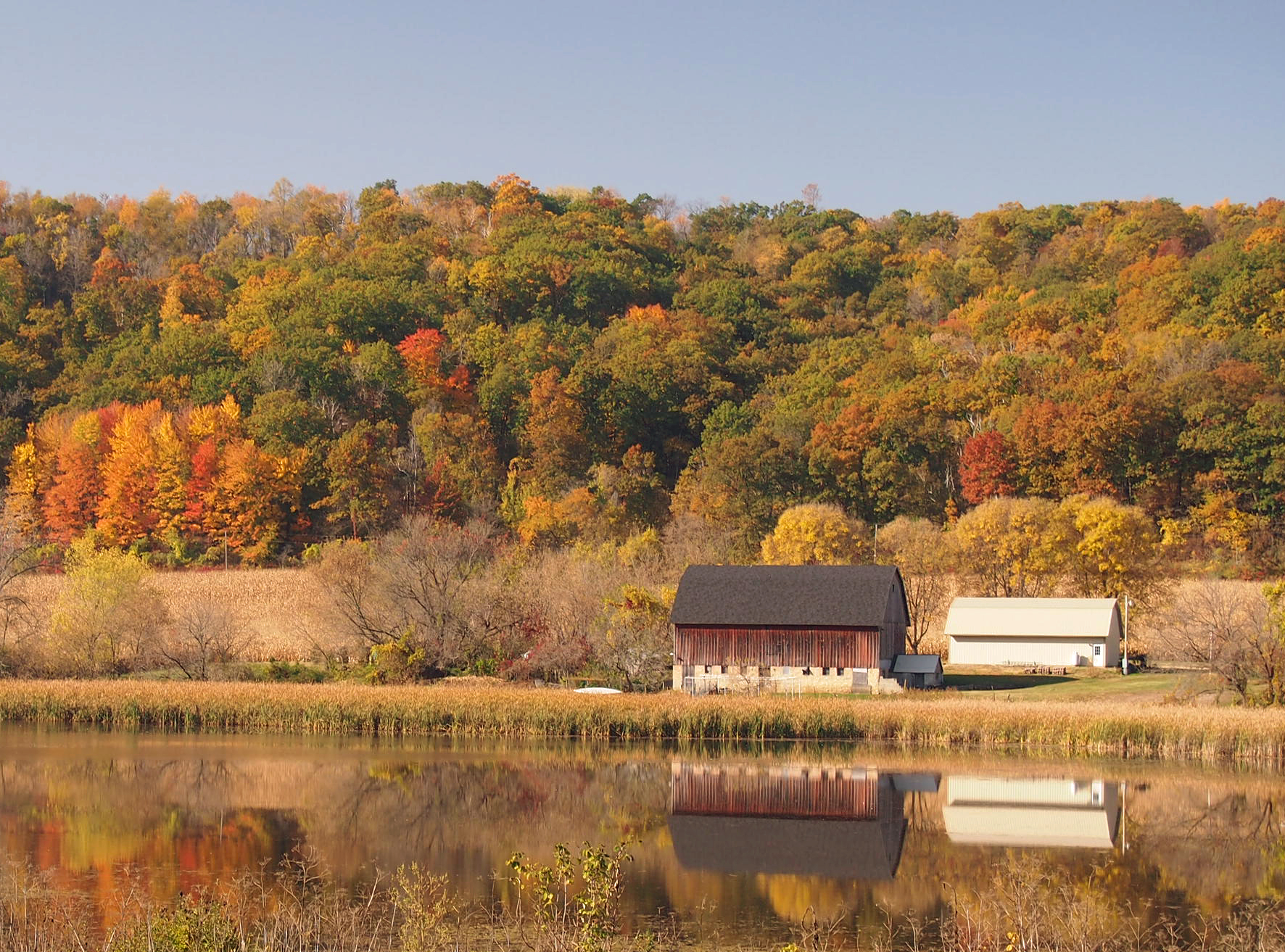
- A farm in Wacouta Township

- Location within the state of Minnesota Wacouta Township, Minnesota (the United States)
- Coordinates: 44°32′49″N 92°27′16″W
- Country: United States
- State: Minnesota
- County: Goodhue

Area
  - Total: 9.8 sq mi (25.3 km^{2})
  - Land: 4.2 sq mi (10.8 km^{2})
  - Water: 5.6 sq mi (14.5 km^{2})
- Elevation: 719 ft (219 m)

Population (2000)
  - Total: 410
  - Density: 98/sq mi (38/km^{2})
- Time zone: UTC-6 (Central (CST))
  - Summer (DST): UTC-5 (CDT)
- FIPS code: 27-67486
- GNIS feature ID: 0665888
- Website: https://wacoutatownship.gov/

Wacouta Township is a township in Goodhue County, Minnesota, United States. The population was 410 at the 2000 census.

The unincorporated community of Wacouta is located within the township.

== History ==
Fort Beauharnois was in what is now Wacouta Township.

Wacouta Township was organized in 1858, and named for Chief Wacouta of the Dakota Indians.

== Geography ==
According to the United States Census Bureau, the township has a total area of 9.8 square miles (25.3 km^{2}), of which 4.2 square miles (10.8 km^{2}) is land and 5.6 square miles (14.5 km^{2}) (57.27%) is water.

== Demographics ==
As of the census of 2000, there were 410 people, 153 households, and 126 families residing in the township. The population density was 98.5 inhabitants per square mile (38.0/km^{2}). There were 193 housing units at an average density of 46.4 per square mile (17.9/km^{2}). The racial makeup of the township was 97.32% White, 0.24% African American, 1.22% Native American, 0.73% Asian, and 0.49% from two or more races. Hispanic or Latino of any race were 0.49% of the population.

There were 153 households, out of which 39.2% had children under the age of 18 living with them, 74.5% were married couples living together, 1.3% had a female householder with no husband present, and 17.0% were non-families. 15.0% of all households were made up of individuals, and 8.5% had someone living alone who was 65 years of age or older. The average household size was 2.68 and the average family size was 2.98.

In the township the population was spread out, with 26.8% under the age of 18, 4.1% from 18 to 24, 28.0% from 25 to 44, 28.0% from 45 to 64, and 12.9% who were 65 years of age or older. The median age was 42 years. For every 100 females, there were 101.0 males. For every 100 females age 18 and over, there were 104.1 males.

The median income for a household in the township was $63,958, and the median income for a family was $71,250. Males had a median income of $45,000 versus $30,000 for females. The per capita income for the township was $29,281. About 2.3% of families and 2.9% of the population were below the poverty line, including 4.8% of those under age 18 and none of those age 65 or over.
