= Red Wing station (Chicago Great Western Railway) =

- Chicago Great Western Depot
- U.S. National Register of Historic Places
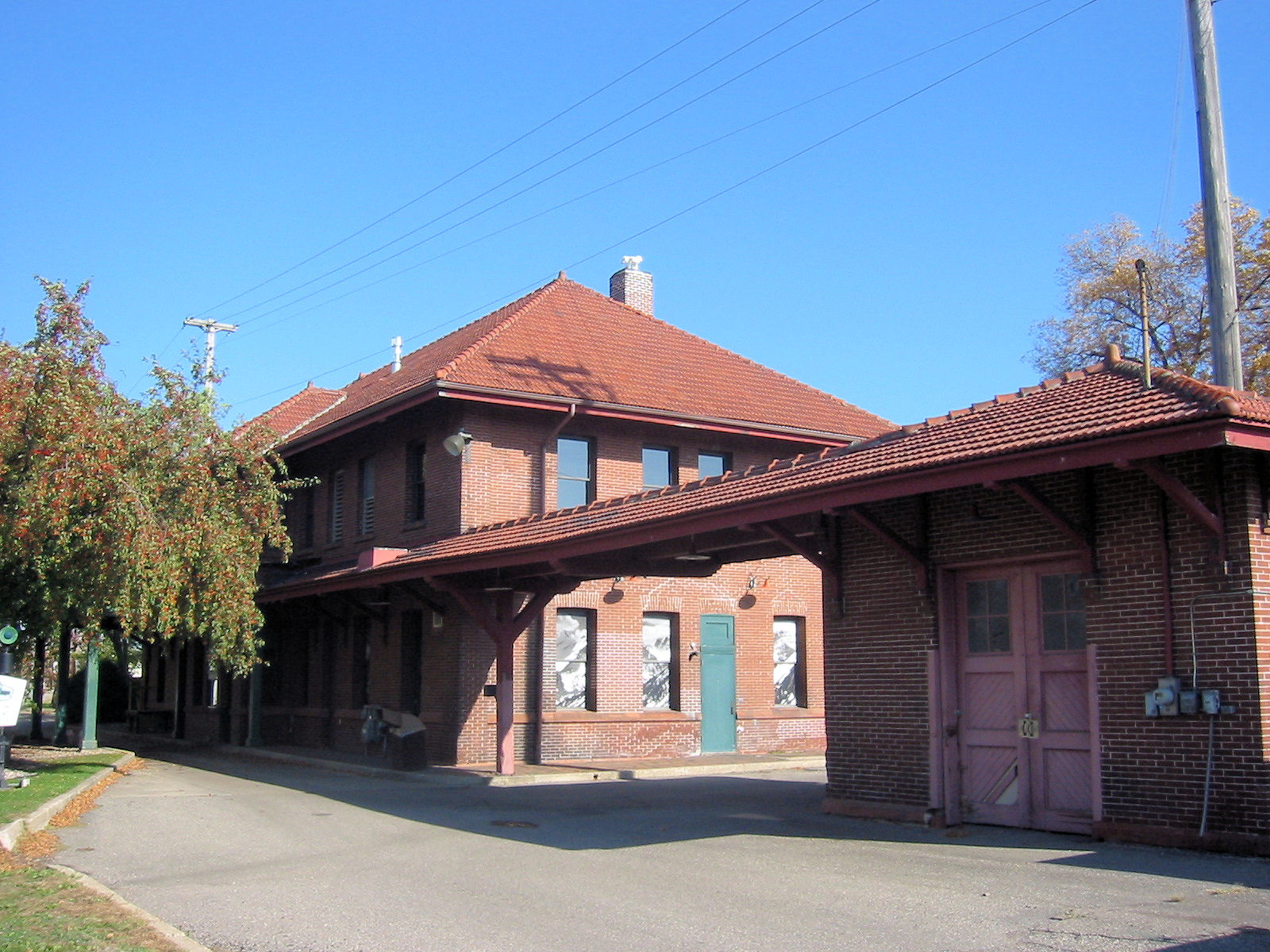
- Red Wing CGW depot building in 2007

- Location within Minnesota Location within the United States
- Location: 726 East Main Street; Red Wing, Minnesota; United States
- Coordinates: 44°33′52″N 92°32′22″W
- Area: less than one acre
- Built: 1906
- NRHP reference No.: 80002056
- Added to NRHP: June 04, 1980

The Chicago Great Western Depot at 726 East Main Street in Red Wing, in the U.S. State of Minnesota, is a former railroad station listed on the National Register of Historic Places. The depot was built in 1906 after the Chicago Great Western Railway (CGW) acquired two small railroads: the Minnesota Central, which connected to Cannon Falls; and the Duluth, Red Wing, and Southern, which connected to Zumbrota. CGW established a divisional headquarters and built this depot in 1906, with passenger space on the first floor and office space on the second floor. The red brick structure was the largest depot the railroad built in Minnesota.

In 1966 the line from Red Wing south to Pine Island was torn up. In 1982 the line from Cannon Falls east to Red Wing, which had not been used for years, was abandoned. The trackage to the depot was removed. The building was remodeled as a Hardee's restaurant in 1979, but by 2006 it became a Caribou Coffee location.

Preceding station	Chicago Great Western Railway	Following station
West Red Wing toward Mankato	Mankato – Simpson	Trout Brook toward Simpson

== See also ==
Red Wing's Amtrak station
