= Pine Island City Hall and Fire Station =

Historic place in Minnesota, United States

- U.S. National Register of Historic Places
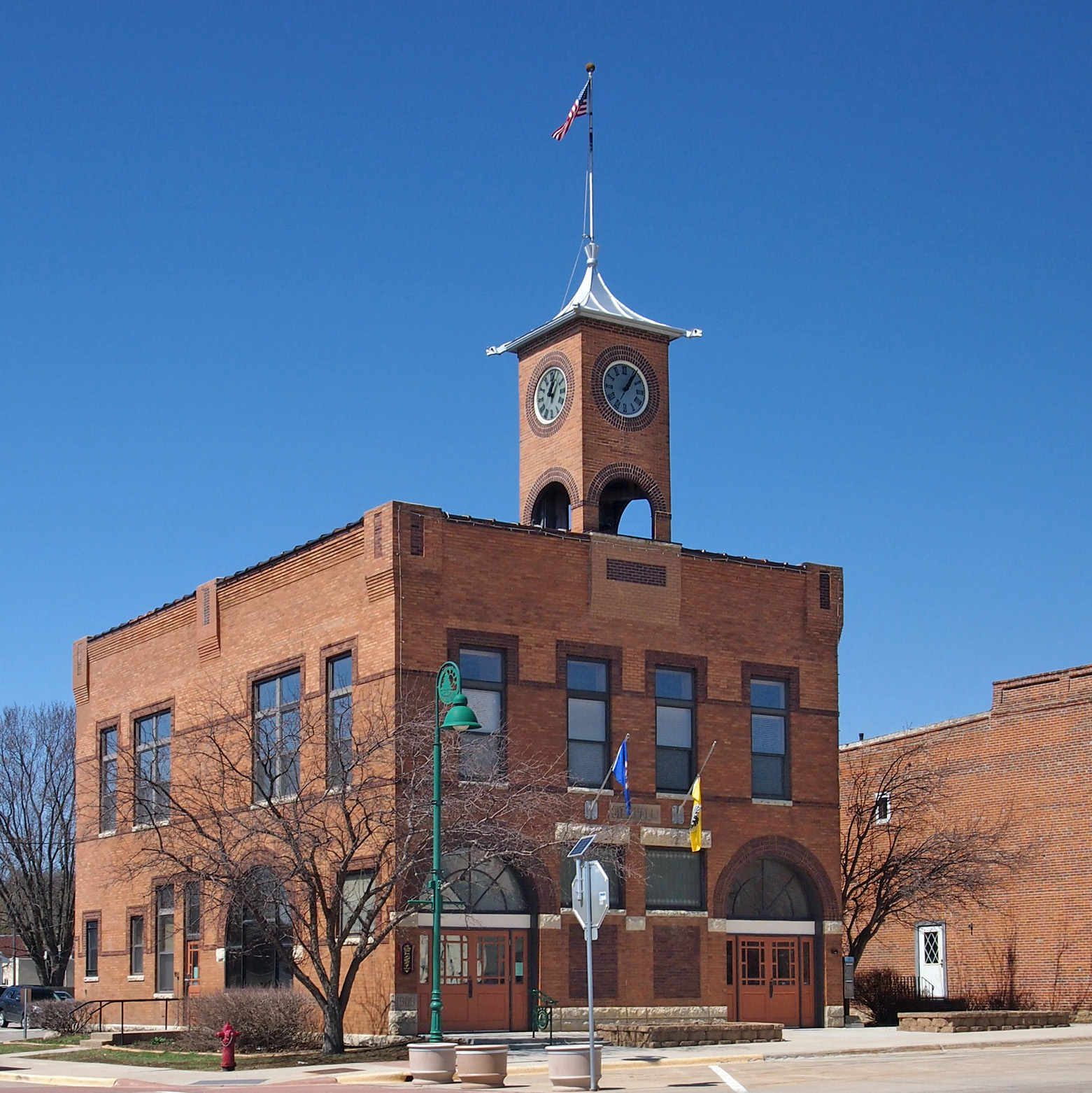
- Pine Island City Hall viewed from the southeast

- Location within Minnesota
- Location: 250 Main Street, Pine Island, Minnesota
- Coordinates: 44°12′02″N 92°38′48″W
- Area: less than one acre
- Built: 1909
- Architectural style: Romanesque, Richardsonian Romanesque
- MPS: Rural Goodhue County MRA
- NRHP reference No.: 80002053
- Added to NRHP: February 12, 1980

The Pine Island City Hall and Fire Station, at Main and 3rd Streets in Pine Island, Minnesota, United States, also known as the Pine Island City Hall, was built in 1909. It was listed on the National Register of Historic Places in 1980.

It was deemed significant as a government building representative of the multipurpose municipal facilities commonly built in southeastern Minnesota in the late 19th and early 20th centuries.

It is a two-story 40 by 60 feet (12 m × 18 m) plan building of orange-yellow brick. It has round-arched doorways, with double doors. It has gargoyles.

Not only did the building include "a large hall, jail, fire station, and council chambers under one roof, but with its massive scale and flamboyant tower, it also served as a statement of strong civic pride."
