= Red Wing Mall Historic District =

- U.S. National Register of Historic Places
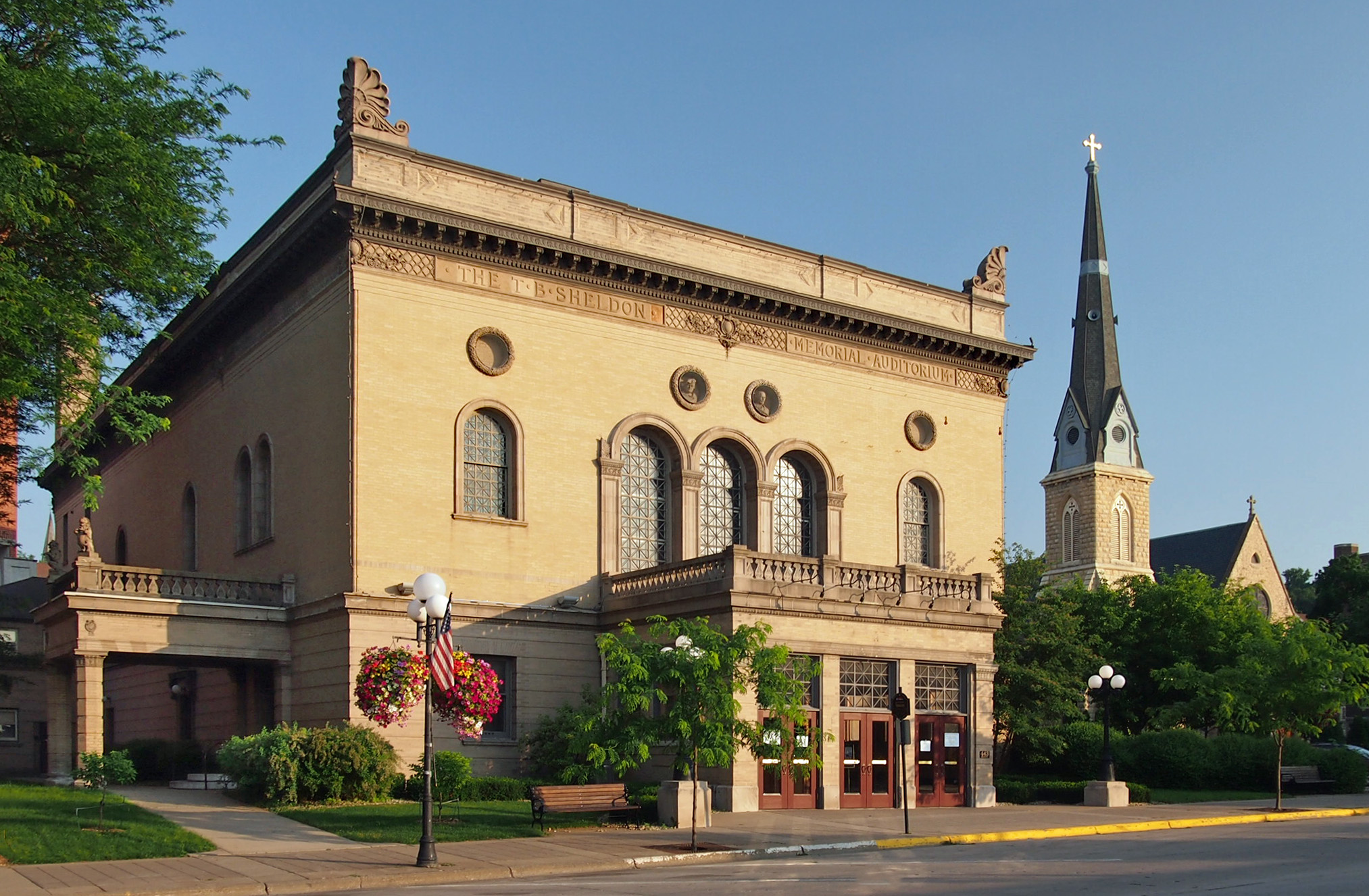
- T.B. Sheldon Memorial Auditorium

- Location within Minnesota
- Location: Along East and West Aves. and Broadway between 6th St. and the levee, Red Wing, Minnesota
- Coordinates: 44.5615°N 92.5340°W
- Area: 38 acres (15 ha)
- Architect: Clarence H. Johnston, Jr.; et al.
- Architectural style: Mixed (more than 2 styles From different periods)
- NRHP reference No.: 80002063
- Added to NRHP: January 8, 1980

The Red Wing Mall Historic District in Red Wing, Minnesota is the civic mall of the community, with a number of public buildings and churches in various architectural styles. The district was listed on the National Register of Historic Places in 1980.

== History ==
When the city was first platted in 1853, the central blocks of the mall were set aside as the location for a courthouse, a school, and a church. The two streets that face the mall, East and West Streets, were originally taken up by residences and a few churches. Hamline University originally had its home on the mall between 1856 and 1869, when it closed and moved to St. Paul in 1880. The city bought the building in 1871, tore it down, and established Central Park in the block immediately north of the Goodhue County Courthouse. The Turner Opera House was built in 1873, seating 900, and was the principal meeting place in the city until it burned down in 1882. Twenty-two of the 49 buildings comprising the district were built by 1890.

During the first decade of the 20th century, more public and institutional buildings were built along the mall, as part of the City Beautiful movement. Levee Park was completed during this time, as well as the Carnegie-Lawther Library (built in 1902 and replaced in 1968), the YMCA building (1910), and the T.B. Sheldon Memorial Auditorium (1904). Fourteen of the 49 buildings in the district were built between 1890 and 1910, nine were built between 1910 and 1930, and the remaining four were built after 1930.

At the time of the National Register nomination in 1979, the Red Wing Heritage Preservation Commission designated a local preservation district. Preservation efforts included the Sheldon Auditorium, the C.F.J. Smith house, the Chalet Studio, and the Lidberg house, and more plans for restoration of the mall's historic buildings were under way.

== Buildings ==
At the time of the nomination, the following fifteen buildings were considered the most architecturally and/or historically significant:

1. Lawther Row Houses, 202-204-206-208 Broadway (1879)
2. Post Office, 222 West Avenue (1910)
3. C.J.F. Smith House, 617 West Third Street (1857)
4. Citizen's Fund Mutual Fire Insurance Building, 426 West Avenue (1930)
5. Swedish Evangelical Lutheran Church, 5th and West Avenue (1895; south addition, 1948; west addition, 1963)
6. Christopher C. Graham House, 625 West Fifth Street (1858, addition in 1914)
7. Swedish Evangelical Lutheran Mission Church, 6th and West Avenue (1875, moved to corner in 1908 from original location on West Sixth)
8. Christ Church, 3rd Street (1871, tower completed in 1898)
9. Christ Church Parish House, 508 West 5th Street (1910); Edwin Hawley Hewitt, architect
10. Goodhue County Courthouse, West 5th Street (1931-32); Buechner and Orth, architects
11. First Presbyterian Church, 6th and East Avenue (1857/1877/1887/1900)
12. C. Friedrich House, 626 East Avenue (1896); Clarence H. Johnston Sr., architect
13. T.B. Sheldon Memorial Auditorium, 443 West Third (1904); Lowell A. Lamoreaux, architect
14. Methodist Episcopal Church, 403 East Avenue (1909)
15. Chicago, Milwaukee, and St. Paul Passenger Depot, Levee Park (1905)

Thirty other buildings were counted as complementary to the character of the district. Levee Park, Central Park, and John H. Rich Park were also counted as integral to the mall's character.
