= St. James Hotel (Red Wing, Minnesota) =

- U.S. National Register of Historic Places
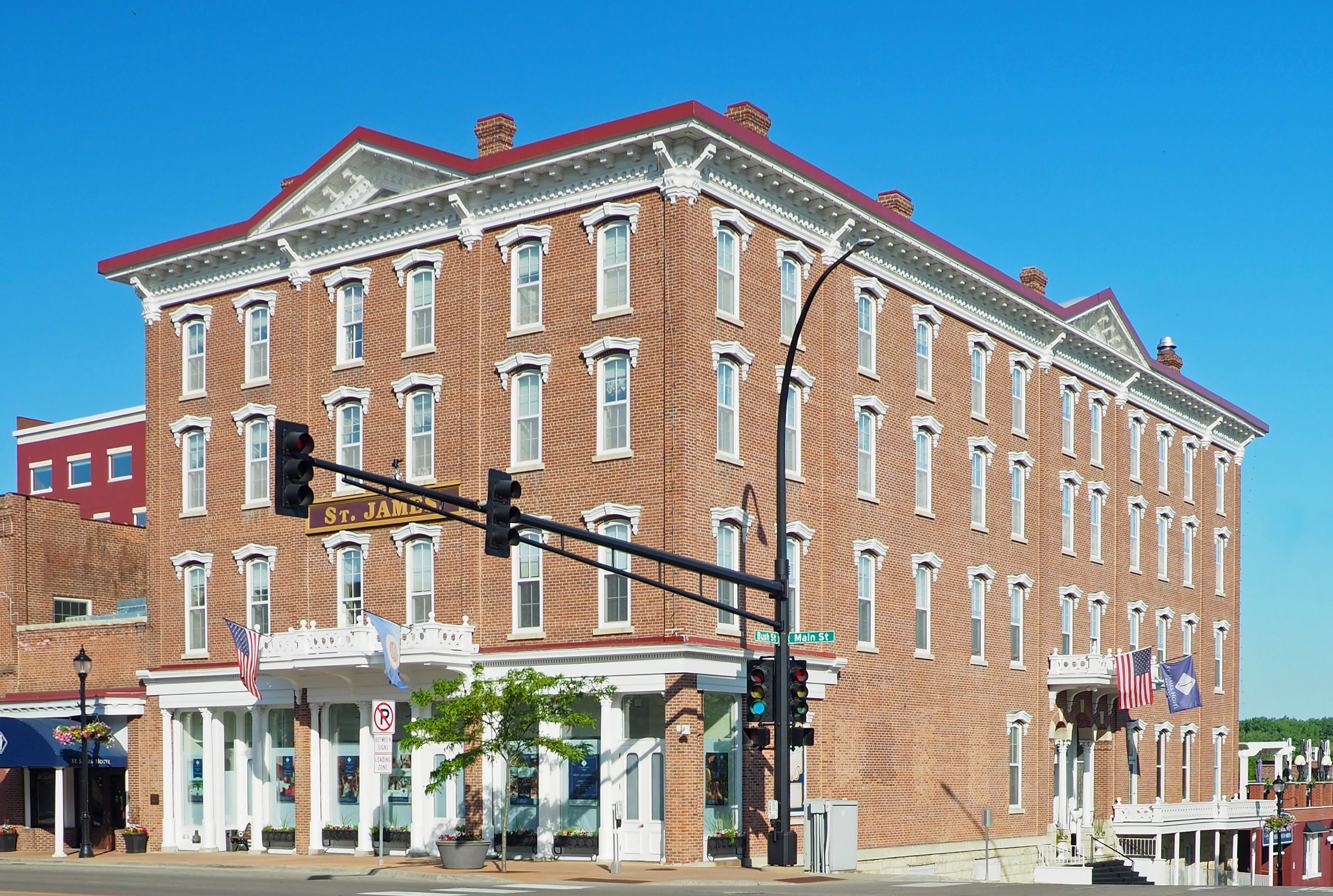
- The St. James Hotel viewed from the east

- Location within Minnesota Location within the United States
- Location: 406 Main Street, Red Wing, Minnesota
- Coordinates: 44°33′55″N 92°32′3″W
- Built: 1874 and 1912
- Architects: Brink, Williams & Co.
- Architectural style: Italianate
- NRHP reference No.: 77000733 and 82002956
- Added to NRHP: September 15, 1977 (original); January 8, 1982 (increase)

St. James Hotel in Red Wing, Minnesota, United States, is an Italianate building built in 1874-1875. It was listed on the National Register of Historic Places in 1977. The NRHP-listed area was increased to become St. James Hotel and Buildings in 1982. St. James Hotel is a member of Historic Hotels of America, the official program of the National Trust for Historic Preservation.

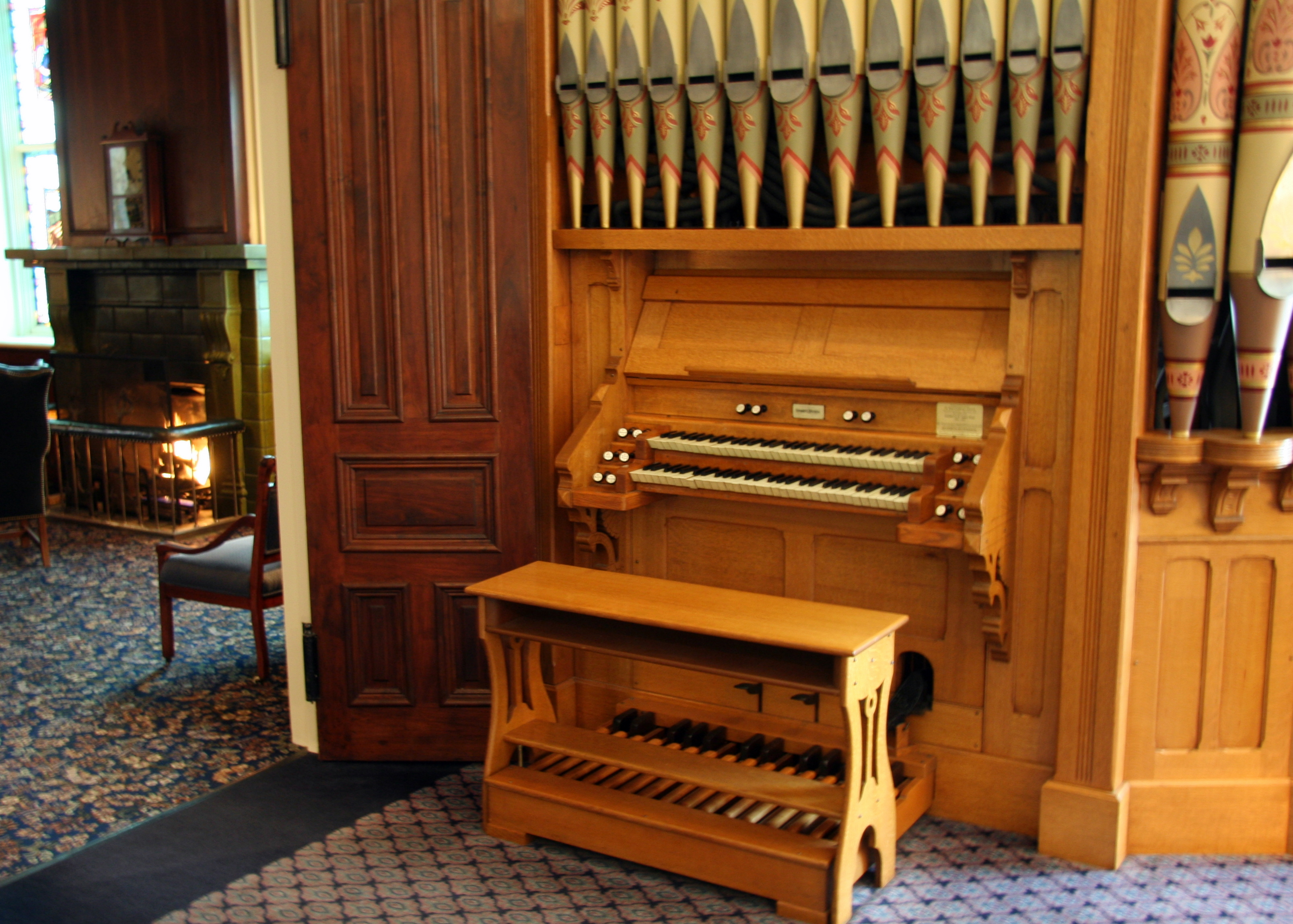
An interior view

Red Wing was the world's largest primary market for wheat in the early 1870s, with a warehouse capacity of over 1,000,000 US bushels (35,000,000 L; 8,000,000 US dry gal; 7,800,000 imp gal) in 1873. As a result of the city's wealth, and with a need to house businesspeople and tourists visiting the city, eleven prominent businessmen invested in the construction of the hotel. It opened with a grand ball on Thanksgiving Day, 1875. It was one of the most elaborate hotels along the Mississippi River and served the city during its heyday as a commercial center and a steamboat stop.

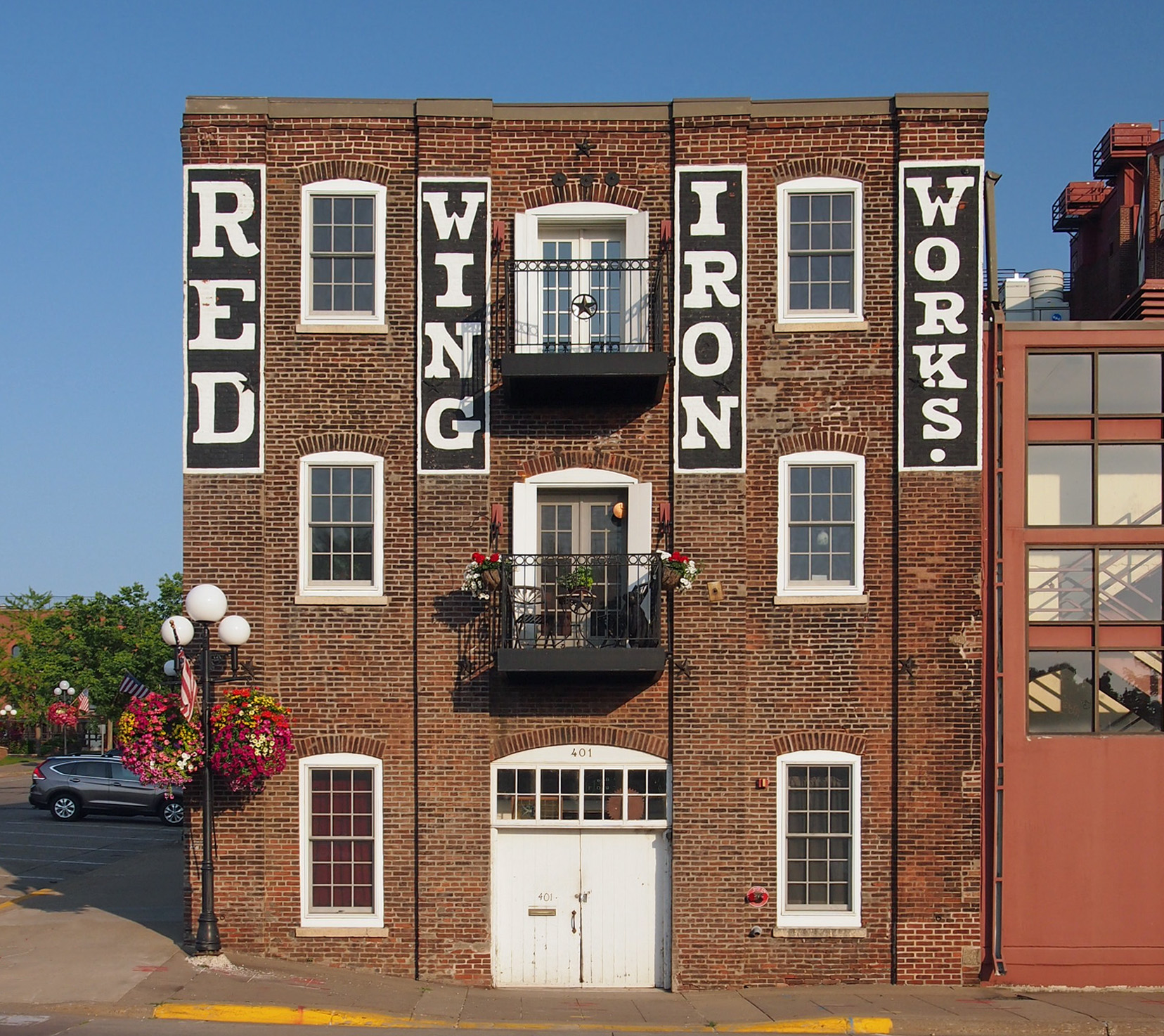
The Red Wing Iron Works Building

The hotel was purchased in 1977 by the Red Wing Shoe Company and renovated. It was also given two additions, a shopping courtyard and a new section for offices and hotel rooms. Until recently, the hotel had 61 guest rooms, each with its own unique decoration and bearing the name of a riverboat that used to travel up and down the Mississippi River. In early 2010, a new suite housed in the old Red Wing Iron Works Building was added to the hotel, bringing the number of rooms to 62.

== See also ==
- List of Historic Hotels of America
