= Red Wing station =

Train station in Red Wing, Minnesota, US

Red Wing, MN
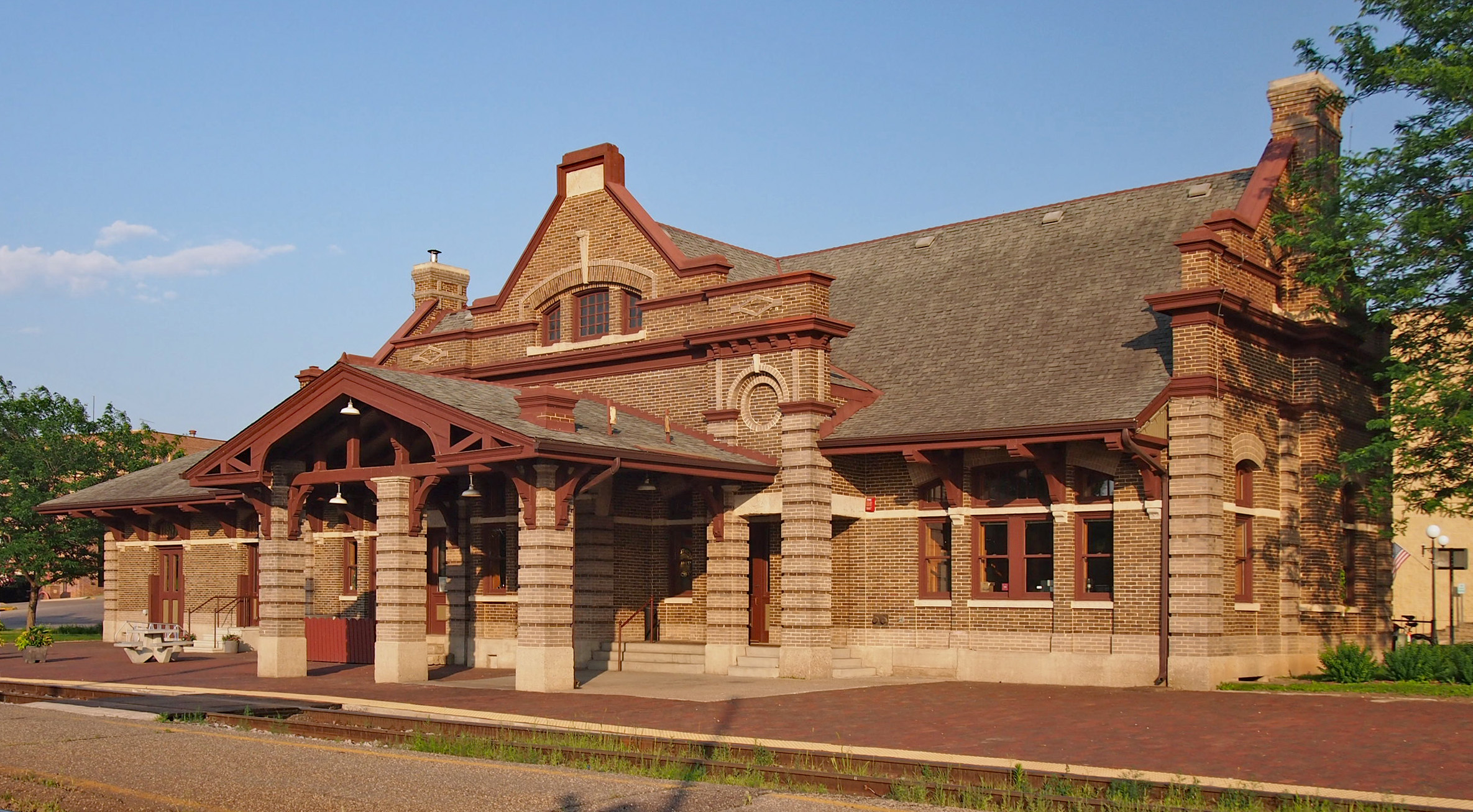
- Trackside at the station, viewed from the northwest

General information
- Location: 420 Levee Street; Red Wing, Minnesota; United States
- Coordinates: 44°33′59″N 92°32′14″W
- Owner: Red Wing Area Fund
- Line: CPKC River Subdivision
- Platforms: 1 side platform, 1 island platform
- Tracks: 3
- Connections: Hiawathaland Transit

Construction
- Parking: 10 long term spaces
- Accessible: Yes

Other information
- Station code: Amtrak: RDW

History
- Opened: 1905
- Rebuilt: 1990

Passengers
- FY 2025: 21,666 (Amtrak)

Services
Preceding station	Amtrak	Following station
St. Paul Terminus	Borealis	Winona toward Chicago
St. Paul toward Seattle or Portland	Empire Builder	Winona toward Chicago
Former services
Preceding station	Amtrak	Following station
Saint Paul–Midway Closed 2014 toward Seattle or Portland	Empire Builder	Winona toward Chicago
Preceding station	Milwaukee Road	Following station
Eggleston toward Seattle or Tacoma	Main Line	Wacouta toward Chicago
Welch toward Cannon Falls	Cannon Falls – Red Wing	Terminus

U.S. Historic district – Contributing property
- Official name: Red Wing Milwaukee Road Passenger Depot
- Designated: January 8, 1980
- Part of: Red Wing Mall Historic District
- Reference no.: 80002063
- Architectural style: Neoclassical revival
Location

Red Wing station is a Amtrak train station in Red Wing, Minnesota, United States. It is served by the daily round trips of the Borealis and Empire Builder.

== Description ==
The station is located at 420 Levee Street on the bank of the Mississippi River, south of the Levee Park and just across the river from Wisconsin. (Although the river lies northwest of the station, the depot is located on the west bank of the Mississippi.) The station is easily accessible from Main Street, via Broad Street, and is within one block of downtown Red Wing. There is an enclosed waiting room (with restrooms) available daily from 8:00 am to 9:45 pm, with a caretaker opening and closing the depot. No other services are provided at the station (i.e., baggage, lounge, telephone, ticketing, etc.). The tracks and platform of the station are owned by the Soo Line Railroad (a subsidiary of Canadian Pacific Kansas City), while the depot building and parking lot are owned by the Red Wing Area Fund (also known as the Red Wing Property Conservation Fund).

== History ==
The depot was originally built by the Chicago, Milwaukee, St. Paul and Pacific Railroad (Milwaukee Road). The depot building also houses Red Wing Arts which features an art gallery and gift shop.

A plaque on the building states, "The construction of this building began in 1904 following an agreement in which the city of Red Wing provided trackage concessions and the railroad agreed to construct this depot and donate money toward construction of Levee Park. This building was designed by the railroad company architect, J.M. Nettenstrom, in a style influenced by the neoclassical revival of the 1893 Chicago Columbian Exposition." The building is a contributing property to the Red Wing Mall Historic District, which is on the National Register of Historic Places.

Borealis service began on May 21, 2024.

== See also ==
- Chicago Great Western Depot
