= Pine Island Van Horn Public Library =

Coordinates: 44°12′0.8″N 92°38′43.14″W

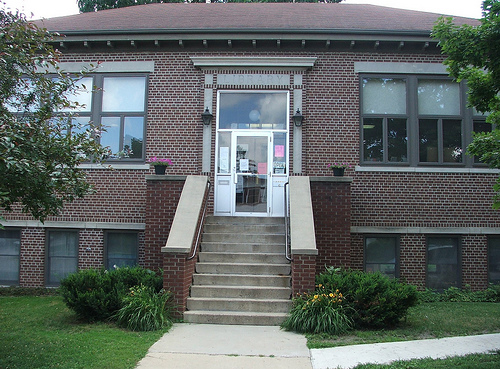
- Pine Island Van Horn Public Library
- Location: 115 SE 3rd Street, Box 38; Pine Island, MN 55963
- Established: 1918

Collection
- Items collected: 21,346

Other information
- Director: Rachel Gray
- Website: http://pineisland.lib.mn.us/

The Pine Island Van Horn Public Library is a library in Pine Island, Minnesota. It is a member of Southeastern Libraries Cooperating, the Southeast Minnesota library region. The library holds both annual and temporary events, which are sometimes seasonal in nature, for both children and adults. An annual book sale, community read program, and children's summer reading program are longtime programs employed at Van Horn. A cart containing books sold to support the library runs continuously.

== History ==
The current facility for the Van Horn Library was funded by a generous estate gift by Frank A. Van Horn, after whom the library is named. Eight thousand dollars was specifically set aside for a library, of which 3/4ths was allotted for construction and the remaining reserved for materials. His entire estate was left for the town and he entrusted his close friend George B. Doty to oversee the responsibility. A plaque was built into the library to commemorate this contribution, and it was intended to open on January 1, 1918, but construction was not completed in time. High school students assisted in building in order to speed its completion. It opened to the public on January 24, 1918. The original rules stated a fine of 2 cents per day a book was overdue, a maximum of two books checked out per person (of which only one could be fiction), and a maximum period of two weeks to return books, a practice which the library still follows today.

In November 1990, a push to move the library to a potential space expansion of the local elementary school was unsuccessful. Supporters of the move expressed a need for a new facility and fears that funding would not be available without the move for the Americans with Disabilities Act modifications to be enforced in 1995. Opponents, organized under the name "Friends of the Van Horn Library", cited concerns of losing a historical landmark within the community, restrictions of books, limited access by community members, and loss of SELCO membership, an important resource to the library. Supporters of the library from both sides rallied behind the slogan "Viva Van Horn". In 1994, only $70,000 of the library-estimated 90,000 dollars needed to install a handicapped-friendly elevator was pledged, and community efforts such as money pledging for miles traveled on the Douglas Trail and public auctions made up the difference to make the library accessible to all patrons.

A mural featuring community-selected classic book scenes was painted by Greg Preslicka in 2010, funded by a shared grant between Van Horn and the Zumbrota Public Library for the Library Legacy Project. Another Library Legacy grant allowed the library to digitize editions of a former local paper from 1882 to 1922 in 2015, which were made available online at the Minnesota Digital Newspaper Hub.

== Current Facility and Programs ==
The building consists of two floors, with a children-focused section as the ground floor and an adult-focused section above. The Van Horn Public Library has been known to collaborate with the nearby Zumbrota Public Library on programs such as the summer reading program, the Pine Haven Community, a local retirement home, and the organization Pine Island People for the Arts (PAPA) for various programs and events, as well as other local businesses and organizations. A Little Free Library is slated to open June 5 which will be owned by the library.
