= List of covered bridges in Minnesota =

This is a listing of vintage and modern covered bridges located in the U.S. state of Minnesota.

== Bridges ==
| Name | County | Location | Coordinates | Built | Length | Spans | Image | Notes |
|---|---|---|---|---|---|---|---|---|
| Pleasure | Anoka | Coon Rapids | 45°8′21.2″N 93°16′25.7″W | 1987 | 50 ft (15 m) | Branch Coon Creek | | |
| 8260 | Anoka | Centerville | 45°12′25.4″N 93°2′8.3″W | 1996 | 12 ft (3.7 m) | pond | | |
| Schaefer | Becker | Frazee | 46°44′11.2″N 95°41′43″W | 1998 | 90 ft (27 m) | Otter Tail River | | |
| Chevalle | Carver | Victoria | 44°50′41″N 93°38′24″W | ~2011 | 60 ft (18 m) | ponds | Chevalle Bridge | |
| Blue Eagle Park | Clay | Barnesville | 46°39′35″N 96°24′44.3″W | ? | ~25 ft (7.6 m) | Whisky Creek | | |
| Lutsen Resort Upper | Cook | Lutsen | 47°38′13.8″N 90°42′26″W | 1930 | 77 ft (23 m) | Poplar River | | |
| Lutsen Resort Lower | Cook | Lutsen | 47°38′10.5″N 90°42′27″W | 1950s | 144 ft (44 m) | Poplar River | | |
| Lande | Crow Wing | Fifty Lakes | 46°44′48″N 94°3′7″W | 1975 | 62 ft (19 m) | Daggett Brook | | |
| Adventureland | Crow Wing | Brainerd | 46°21′3.8″N 94°1′42.4″W | ? | 23 ft (7.0 m) | Dry Creek | | Located at Paul Bunyan Land |
| Goat Island | Dodge | Mantorville | 44°3′49″N 92°45′27″W | 1972 | 32 ft (9.8 m) | South Branch Middle Fork Zumbro River | | |
| Zumbrota | Goodhue | Zumbrota | 44°17′47″N 92°40′13.5″W | 1869 | 120 ft (37 m) | North Fork Zumbro River | Zumbrota Covered Bridge | Listed on the U.S. National Register of Historic Places. |
| Swanson/Whippler | Hennepin | Bloomington | 44°47′39.5″N 93°21′37.4″W | 1975 | 54 ft (16 m) | pond | | |
| Richard Hammel Memorial | Hennepin | Edina | 44°53′20.8″N 93°22′22.5″W | 1988 | 62 ft (19 m) | Nine Mile Creek | | |
| ? | Houston | Reno | 43°33′54.5″N 91°17′2″W | ? | ? | ditch | | |
| Lions | Mower | Austin | 43°40′42.8″N 92°56′4.2″W | 1974 | 26 ft (7.9 m) | Dobbins Creek | | |
| Lake Lida | Otter Tail | Pelican Rapids | 46°33′49.3″N 96°0′18″W | ? | 14 ft (4.3 m) | brook | | On Lida Greens Golf Course. |
| Stensgaard | Pennington | Thief River Falls | | 1979 | 16 ft (4.9 m) | ? | | |
| Sturgeon Island | Pine | Windmere Township | 46°22′44.7″N 92°44′39.7″W | 1970 | 40 ft (12 m) | channel | | |
| Clandstine | Ramsey | North Oaks | 45°5′43.4″N 93°4′28.3″W | 1997 | 43 ft (13 m) | pond | | |
| Kiechker's Crossing | Renville | Fairfax | 44°32′1.4″N 94°39′59″W | 1985 | 60 ft (18 m) | Little Rock Creek | | |
| Lake Wobegon Trail | Stearns | Holdingford | 45°43′43″N 94°28′39″W | 2008 | 186 ft (57 m) | Two Rivers | | Longest covered bridge in Minnesota, located along the Lake Wobegon Trail. |
| Horseshoe Lake | Washington | Scandia | 45°15′28.5″N 92°49′20.4″W | 1981 | 32 ft (9.8 m) | Horseshoe Lake | | |
| Covered Bridge Farm | Washington | Forest Lake | 45°13′12″N 92°58′49.8″W | ? | ~19 ft (5.8 m) | small stream | | |

Below is a list of some of the other historic covered bridges in Minnesota which were eventually destroyed, removed or altered.

| Name | County | Location | Built | Length | Spanned | Notes |
|---|---|---|---|---|---|---|
| The Arches | Winona | Winona | 1968 | 16 ft (4.9 m) | Peterson Brook | Destroyed by a flood in 2007 |
