= Wastedo, Minnesota =

Unincorporated community in Minnesota, United States

Wastedo
- Unincorporated community
- Location within Minnesota Location within the United States
- Coordinates: 44°24′17″N 92°51′05″W
- Country: United States
- State: Minnesota
- County: Goodhue
- Township: Leon
- Elevation: 1,188 ft (362 m)
- Time zone: UTC-6 (Central (CST))
  - Summer (DST): UTC-5 (CDT)
- ZIP code: 55009
- Area code: 507
- GNIS feature ID: 654996

Wastedo is an unincorporated community in Leon Township, Goodhue County, Minnesota, United States.

The community is located near the junction of U.S. Highway 52, County Road 9 / 380th Street, and 90th Avenue. County Road 1 / 100th Avenue is nearby.

Nearby places include Cannon Falls, Dennison, Goodhue, Hader, and Zumbrota.

Wastedo was settled in 1856. The community had a post office from 1857 until 1903.
