= Whiskey Creek =

Whiskey Creek or Whisky Creek may refer to:

- Whiskey Creek, a tributary of the American River, along the Sierra Crest in California
- Whiskey Creek, Florida, a census-designated place in Lee County, Florida
- Archaeological site within the Pi-wan-go-ning Prehistoric District, Michigan
- Whisky Creek (Red River of the North), a stream in Minnesota
- Whisky Creek (Touchet River), a stream in Washington (state)
