= Oliver J. Lee =

American teacher and politician (1876–1947)

Oliver J. Lee (January 7, 1876 – August 11, 1947) was an American educator, farmer, and politician.

Lee was born in Leon Township, Goodhue County, Minnesota and went to the Goodhue County public schools. He graduated from the Red Wing Seminary in Red Wing, Minnesota in 1897. Lee also went to the Northern Illinois University and to the Dixon Business College in Dixon, Illinois. Lee was an instructor in bookkeeping and shorthand at the business college in Iowa City, Iowa. He was a farmer and public school teacher. He lived in Zumbrota, Minnesota with his wife and family. Lee served in the Minnesota House of Representatives from 1919 to 1922.
