= Whisky (disambiguation) =

Whisky (also spelt whiskey) is a distilled alcoholic beverage.

Whisky or whiskey may also refer to:

== Arts and entertainment ==
=== Music ===
- Way Down Yonder (re-released in 1997 as Whiskey), an album by Charlie Daniels

==== Songs ====
- "Whiskey" (Maroon 5 song), released in 2017
- "Whiskey" (Jana Kramer song), released in 2012
- Whiskey (Copperhead song), released in 1992
- "Whiskey", by Inspiral Carpets from Dung 4 (1989)
- "Whiskey", by Loggins and Messina's from Loggins and Messina (1972)
- "Whiskey", by New Riders of the Purple Sage from Gypsy Cowboy (1972)
- "Whiskey (Release Me)", by A$AP Rocky ft. Gorillaz and Westside Gunn from Don't Be Dumb (2026)

=== Other arts and entertainment ===
- Whisky (film), a 2004 Argentine-German-Spanish-Uruguayan film
- Whiskey (play), a 1973 one-act play by Terrence McNally
- Whiskey, a character from the TV series Dollhouse
- Whiskey, a character from Kingsman: The Golden Circle

== Other uses ==
- Whiskey (carriage) a light two-wheeled carriage for two persons
- Whisky a Go Go or The Whisky, a nightclub in West Hollywood, California, U.S.
- Whiskey-class submarine, a class of Soviet naval submarines
- Whisky, the letter W in the NATO phonetic alphabet
- Whiskey Creek (disambiguation)

== See also ==
- Whiskey Gap, Alberta, a ghost town in southern Alberta, Canada
- Whisky Party
