= Pine Island, Minnesota =

City in Minnesota, United States

Pine Island
- City
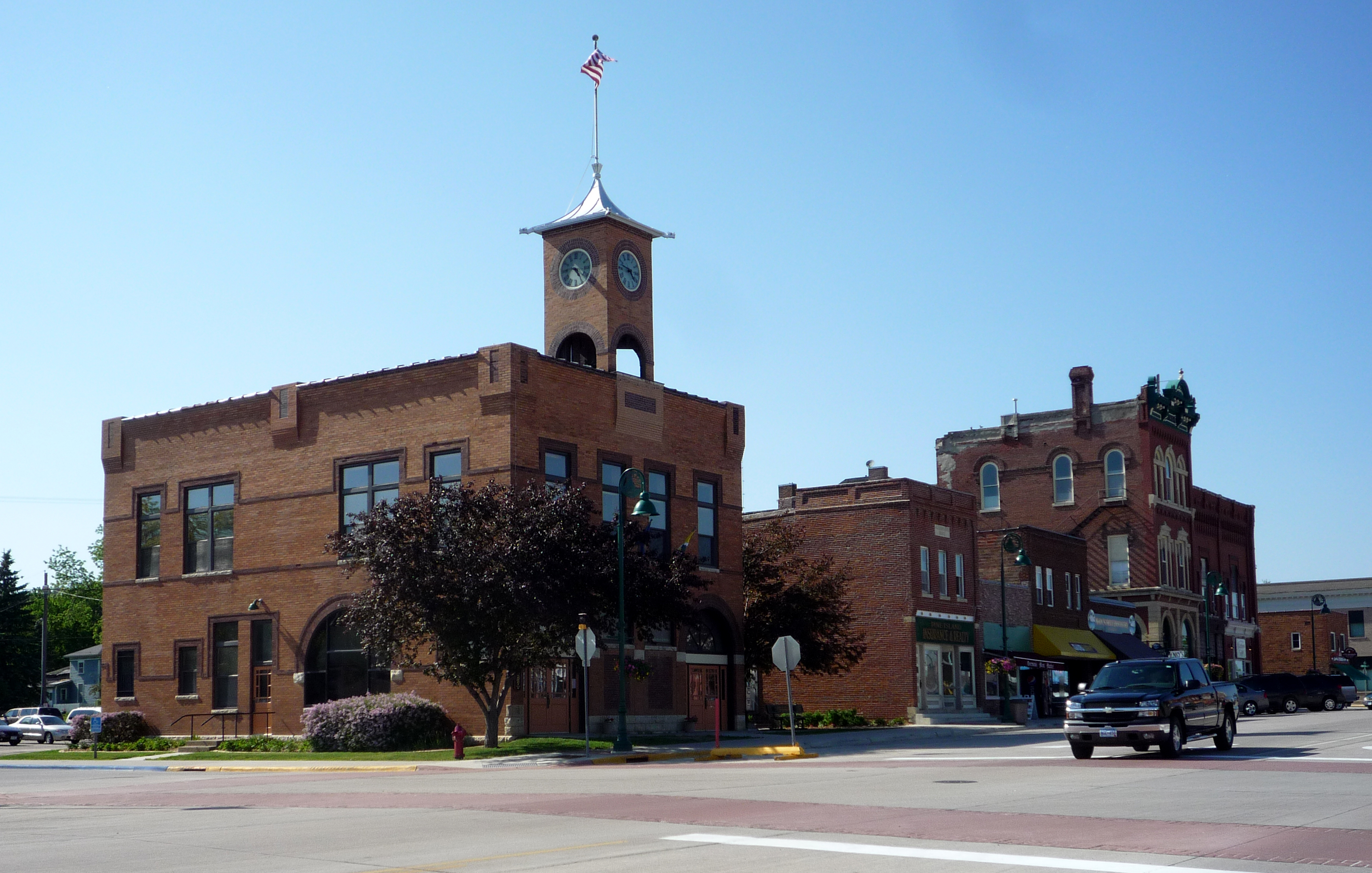
- City Hall and downtown Pine Island

- Location of Pine Island within Goodhue and Olmsted Counties in the state of Minnesota
- Coordinates: 44°12′04″N 92°37′28″W
- Country: United States
- State: Minnesota
- Counties: Goodhue, Olmsted

Area
  - Total: 6.02 sq mi (15.60 km^{2})
  - Land: 5.99 sq mi (15.52 km^{2})
  - Water: 0.031 sq mi (0.08 km^{2})
- Elevation: 994 ft (303 m)

Population (2020)
  - Total: 3,769
  - Density: 629.1/sq mi (242.89/km^{2})
- Time zone: UTC-6 (Central (CST))
  - Summer (DST): UTC-5 (CDT)
- ZIP code: 55963
- Area code: 507
- FIPS code: 27-51136
- GNIS feature ID: 2396208
- Website: https://pineislandmn.gov/

Pine Island is a city in Goodhue and Olmsted counties in the U.S. state of Minnesota. Most of Pine Island is in Goodhue County, but a small part extends into Olmsted County, making that portion part of the Rochester metropolitan area. As of the 2020 census, the population was 3,769.

The community has a strong agricultural base, but has been transitioning over time into a bedroom community for nearby Rochester, which employs many local residents. It is also the site of Minnesota's first diverging diamond interchange.

== History ==
Pine Island was platted in 1856. A post office has been in operation at Pine Island since 1856. The name of the town originates from an ancient Dakota language name Wazi Wíta (Island of Pines) originating from a cluster of pine trees at a bend in the river on the site of the modern-day town.

== Geography ==
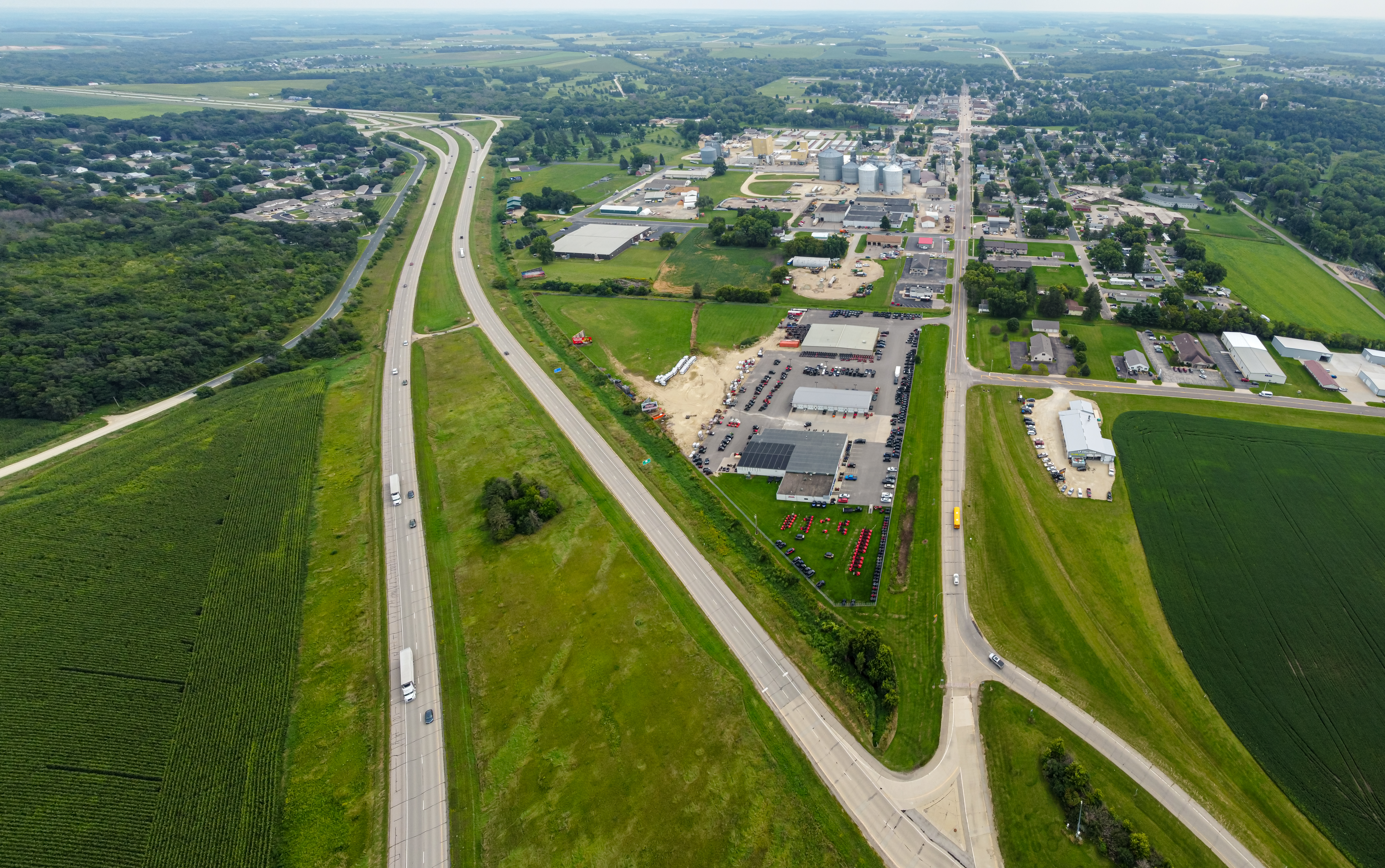

Pine Island lies along the Middle Fork of the Zumbro River. According to the United States Census Bureau, the city has an area of 5.61 square miles (14.53 km^{2}), of which 5.59 square miles (14.48 km^{2}) is land and 0.02 square miles (0.05 km^{2}) is water.

U.S. Highway 52 serves as a main route in the community.

=== Climate ===
Climate data for Pine Island, Minnesota
| Month | Jan | Feb | Mar | Apr | May | Jun | Jul | Aug | Sep | Oct | Nov | Dec | Year |
|---|---|---|---|---|---|---|---|---|---|---|---|---|---|
| Record high °F (°C) | 58 (14) | 64 (18) | 83 (28) | 93 (34) | 107 (42) | 106 (41) | 109 (43) | 101 (38) | 101 (38) | 94 (34) | 78 (26) | 79 (26) | 109 (43) |
| Mean daily maximum °F (°C) | 24 (−4) | 29 (−2) | 43 (6) | 61 (16) | 69 (21) | 79 (26) | 85 (29) | 81 (27) | 73 (23) | 63 (17) | 42 (6) | 29 (−2) | 57 (14) |
| Mean daily minimum °F (°C) | 3 (−16) | 7 (−14) | 20 (−7) | 45 (7) | 44 (7) | 55 (13) | 62 (17) | 56 (13) | 49 (9) | 35 (2) | 22 (−6) | 8 (−13) | 34 (1) |
| Record low °F (°C) | −43 (−42) | −35 (−37) | — | — | — | — | — | — | — | — | — | — | −43 (−42) |
| Average precipitation inches (mm) | 0.90 (23) | 0.88 (22) | 1.92 (49) | 3.35 (85) | 3.75 (95) | 4.67 (119) | 4.25 (108) | 4.88 (124) | 3.80 (97) | 2.46 (62) | 2.02 (51) | 1.13 (29) | 34.01 (864) |
Source: The Weather Channel

== Demographics ==
Historical population
| Census | Pop. | Note | %± |
|---|---|---|---|
| 1880 | 656 | | — |
| 1890 | 548 | | −16.5% |
| 1900 | 832 | | 51.8% |
| 1910 | 834 | | 0.2% |
| 1920 | 934 | | 12.0% |
| 1930 | 961 | | 2.9% |
| 1940 | 1,040 | | 8.2% |
| 1950 | 1,298 | | 24.8% |
| 1960 | 1,308 | | 0.8% |
| 1970 | 1,640 | | 25.4% |
| 1980 | 1,977 | | 20.5% |
| 1990 | 2,125 | | 7.5% |
| 2000 | 2,337 | | 10.0% |
| 2010 | 3,263 | | 39.6% |
| 2020 | 3,769 | | 15.5% |
U.S. Decennial Census

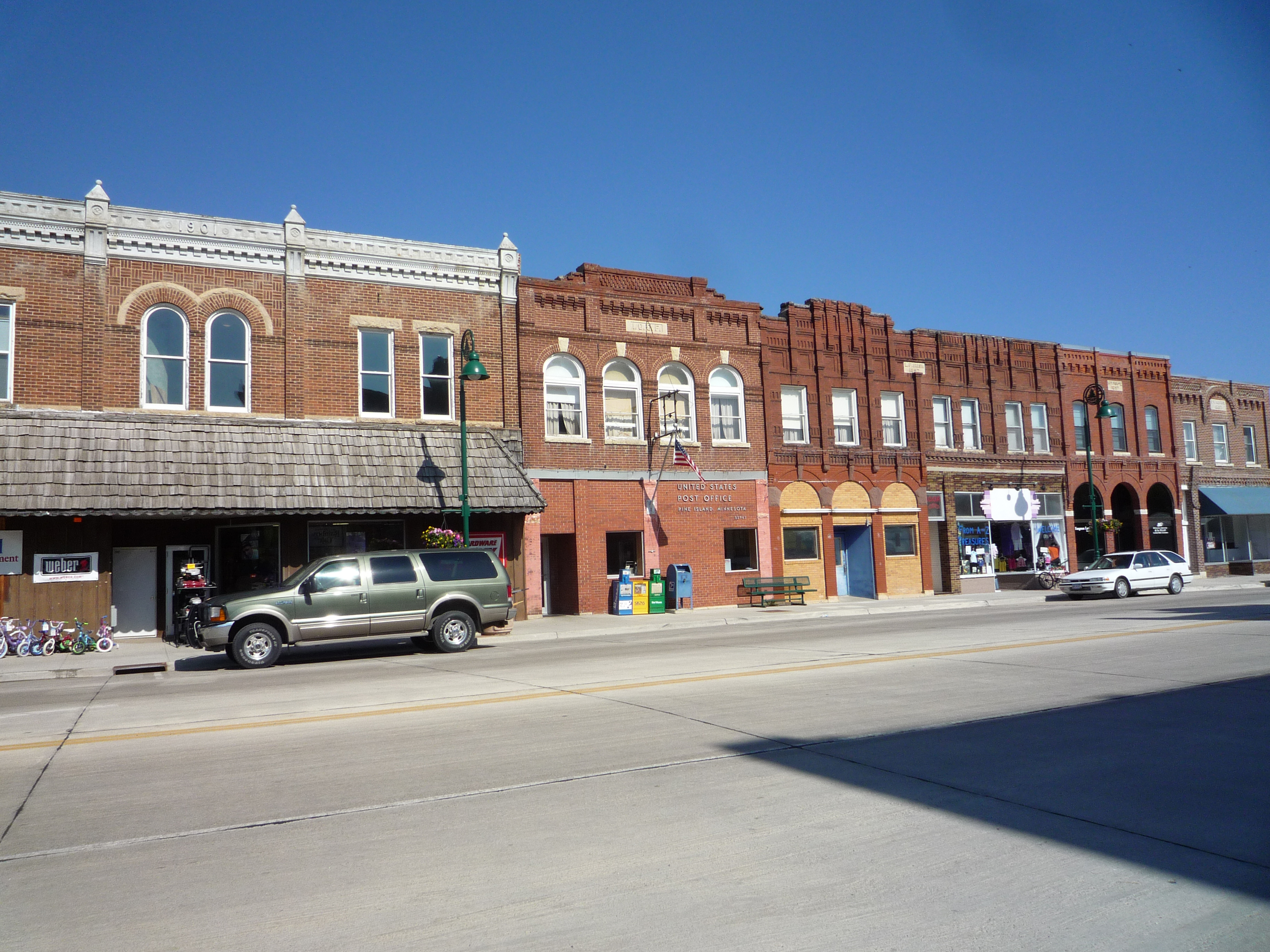
Downtown and post office

=== Income and poverty ===
As of 2000 the median income for a household in the city was $47,500, and the median income for a family was $59,792. Males had a median income of $32,788 versus $25,031 for females. The per capita income for the city was $20,370. About 4.5% of families and 5.6% of the population were below the poverty line, including 6.2% of those under age 18 and 14.6% of those age 65 or over.

=== 2020 census ===
As of the 2020 census, Pine Island had a population of 3,769. The median age was 35.7 years. 27.5% of residents were under the age of 18 and 16.1% of residents were 65 years of age or older. For every 100 females there were 95.6 males, and for every 100 females age 18 and over there were 89.1 males age 18 and over.

0.0% of residents lived in urban areas, while 100.0% lived in rural areas.

There were 1,471 households in Pine Island, of which 37.3% had children under the age of 18 living in them. Of all households, 51.9% were married-couple households, 14.9% were households with a male householder and no spouse or partner present, and 24.6% were households with a female householder and no spouse or partner present. About 26.2% of all households were made up of individuals and 11.9% had someone living alone who was 65 years of age or older.

There were 1,518 housing units, of which 3.1% were vacant. The homeowner vacancy rate was 1.4% and the rental vacancy rate was 4.6%.

Racial composition as of the 2020 census
| Race | Number | Percent |
|---|---|---|
| White | 3,415 | 90.6% |
| Black or African American | 71 | 1.9% |
| American Indian and Alaska Native | 9 | 0.2% |
| Asian | 49 | 1.3% |
| Native Hawaiian and Other Pacific Islander | 1 | 0.0% |
| Some other race | 26 | 0.7% |
| Two or more races | 198 | 5.3% |
| Hispanic or Latino (of any race) | 82 | 2.2% |

=== 2010 census ===
As of the census of 2010, there were 3,263 people, 1,292 households, and 873 families residing in the city. The population density was 583.7 inhabitants per square mile (225.4/km^{2}). There were 1,399 housing units at an average density of 250.3 units per square mile (96.6 units/km^{2}). The racial makeup of the city was 96.6% White, 0.9% African American, 0.1% Native American, 0.8% Asian, 0.1% Pacific Islander, 0.1% from other races, and 1.3% from two or more races. Hispanic or Latino of any race were 1.7% of the population.

There were 1,292 households, of which 36.1% had children under the age of 18 living with them, 53.3% were married couples living together, 10.5% had a female householder with no husband present, 3.8% had a male householder with no wife present, and 32.4% were non-families. 26.9% of all households were made up of individuals, and 10.7% had someone living alone who was 65 years of age or older. The average household size was 2.47 and the average family size was 3.02.

The median age in the city was 35.2 years. 27.4% of residents were under the age of 18; 6.8% were between the ages of 18 and 24; 26.9% were from 25 to 44; 25.3% were from 45 to 64; and 13.5% were 65 years of age or older. The gender makeup of the city was 48.4% male and 51.6% female.

== Notable people ==
- Lucas John "Luke" Helder, former musician accused of involvement in a bombing.
- Ralph Wilford Samuelson, the inventor of waterskiing, moved to Pine Island from Lake City, Minnesota to raise turkeys and remained until his death.

== See also ==
- Pine Island Van Horn Public Library
- Pine Island Township
