= Zumbrota Covered Bridge =

- U.S. National Register of Historic Places
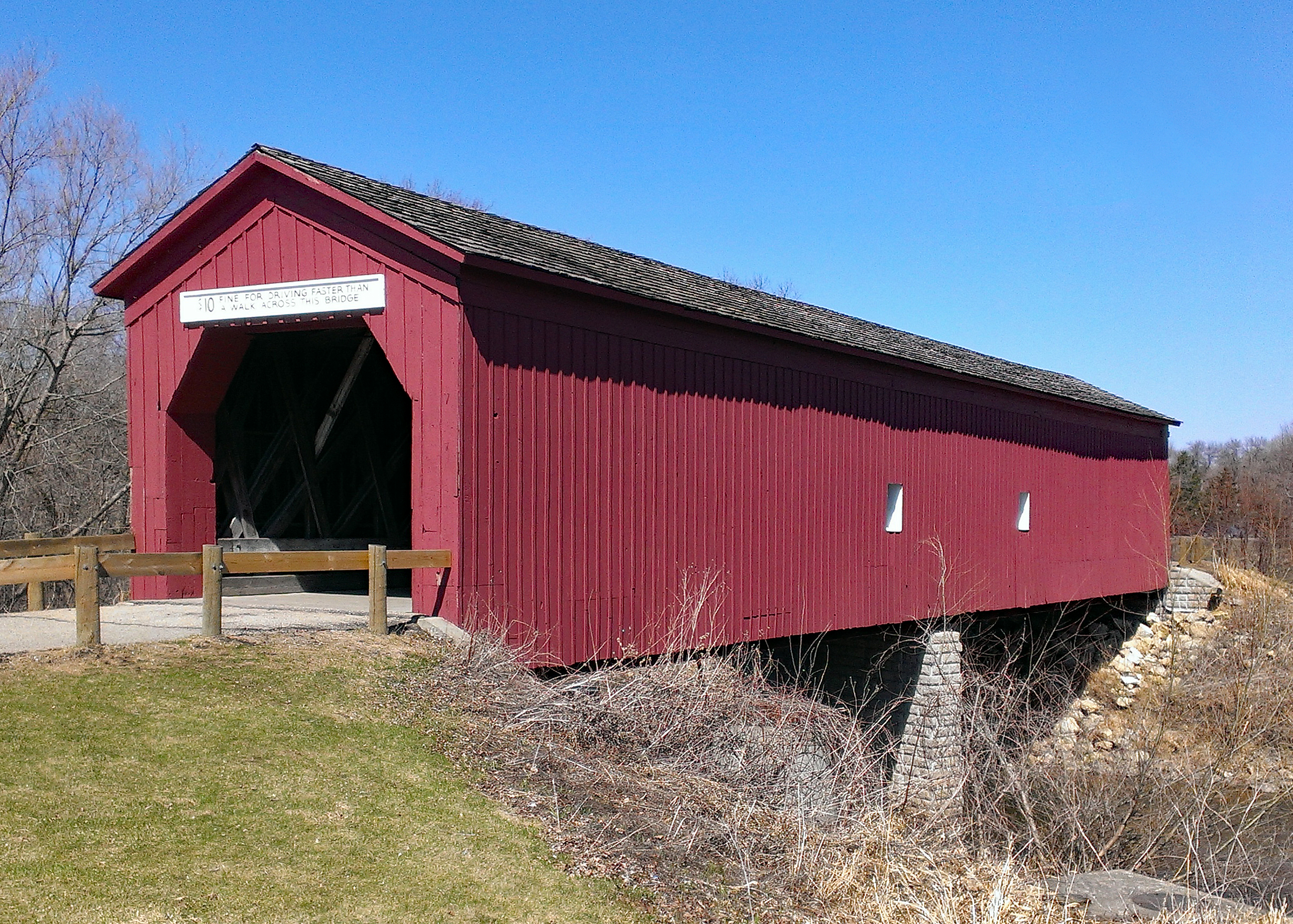
- The Zumbrota Covered Bridge from the southeast

- Location within Minnesota Location within the United States
- Location: West Avenue over the North Fork of the Zumbro River
- Nearest city: Zumbrota, Minnesota
- Coordinates: 44°17′47″N 92°40′13.5″W
- Built: 1869
- Architect: Stafford Western Immigration Co.
- MPS: Rural Goodhue County MRA (AD)
- NRHP reference No.: 75000984
- Added to NRHP: February 20, 1975

The Zumbrota Covered Bridge is the last remaining historic covered bridge in the U.S. state of Minnesota. It has been restored and is located in Covered Bridge Park in Zumbrota, Minnesota.

== History ==
The bridge was completed in November 1869 as a replacement for Zumbrota's original bridge which was destroyed by the spring flood of that year. The bridge has latticed wooden-trusses and is structured to look like a barn; it is 116-feet long, and has a 15-feet wide roadway. The covered portion of the bridge was added in 1871. The bridge served until 1932 when it was moved to the fairgrounds. In 1997 the bridge was moved to its current location in Covered Bridge Park, about 100 yards (90 m) from its original location.

In 1905, Zumbrota had a bridge often called "Zumbrota's second covered bridge" which spanned the Zumbro River, about 0.5 miles (1 km) mile upstream. It was a railroad bridge for the Duluth, Red Wing, and Southern Railroad.

The bridge roof partially collapsed on February 24, 2019, following one of the snowiest months in state history. The bridge has since been restored, after an effort costing roughly $250,000.

== See also ==
- List of bridges documented by the Historic American Engineering Record in Minnesota
- List of Minnesota covered bridges
