= Genevieve Stearns =

Biochemist

- Education: University of Michigan
- Scientific career
- Thesis: Studies on the intermediary metabolism of cystine (1930)

Genevieve Stearns (1892–1997) was a biochemist, most recognized for her accomplishments in research and advocacy for nutrition, especially for women and children.

== Early life and education ==
Stearns was born in Zumbrota, Minnesota, to parents Clayton H. Stearns and Clara (née Beierwalter) Stearns.

She received her bachelor's degree in science from Carleton College in 1912. She taught high school for six years, and then attended graduate school at the University of Illinois and worked as a chemistry assistant while earning her master's degree. Her master's degree, completed in 1920, examined creatinuria, specifically focusing on the impact of diet and sex. In 1920, she worked as research associate in nutrition at the child welfare research station at the University of Iowa.

After five years as a research associate, she returned to school to earn her doctorate from University of Michigan in 1928. Her research focused on metabolism, and her dissertation was on the intermediary metabolism of cystine.

== Career ==
She spent the majority of her career at the University of Iowa, and reached full professor in 1943. She studied the metabolism of Vitamins A and D and minerals, growth chemistry, bone and cartilage metabolic disturbance, and rickets. During a 1957 interview with Stearns, she described how she studied cohorts of children, over extended periods of time, to gain a better understanding of how to best feed children.

After spending a few years as a professor of pediatrics, in 1950 she was selected by the World Health Organization to go to Europe for seminars about metabolism.

After her retirement, she received the Fulbright Scholarship to work at the Women’s College of Ein Shams University in Cairo, Egypt from 1960 until 1961. She was selected as a fellow for the American Institute of Nutrition in 1965, and was a member of the Society of Biological Chemists and the American Chemical Society. She has garnered many awards for her accomplishments, including the Alumni Achievement Award from Carleton College, the Borden Award of the American Home Economics Association (1942) and the Borden Award of the American Institute of Nutrition (1946).

== Selected publications ==
- Stearns, Genevieve; Lewis, Howard B. (1930). "The Metabolism of Sulfur". Journal of Biological Chemistry. 86 (1): 93–105. doi:10.1016/s0021-9258(18)76907-x. ISSN 0021-9258.
- Stearns, Genevieve (1939-07-01). "The Mineral Metabolism of Normal Infants". Physiological Reviews. 19 (3): 415–438. doi:10.1152/physrev.1939.19.3.415. ISSN 0031-9333.
- Jeans, P. C.; Stearns, Genevieve (1938-11-01). "The effect of vitamin D on linear growth in infancy: II. The effect of intakes above 1,800 U.S.P. units daily". The Journal of Pediatrics. 13 (5): 730–740. doi:10.1016/S0022-3476(38)80162-1. ISSN 0022-3476.
- Stearns, Genevieve (1968-11-01). "Fifty Years of Experience in Nutrition and a Look to the Future". American Journal of Public Health and the Nation's Health. 58 (11): 2027–2035. doi:10.2105/AJPH.58.11.2027. ISSN 0002-9572. PMC 1229035. PMID 18018236.
- Stearns, Genevieve (1959). "Infants and Toddlers": 283–295.
