= Luke Helder =

American domestic terrorist

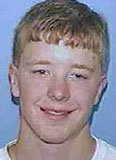
- Helder's FBI mugshot
- Born: Lucas John Helder; May 5, 1981 (age 45); Pine Island, Minnesota
- Occupations: Student, Musician
- Status: Incompetent to stand trial, committed to Federal Bureau of Prisons mental health center
- Criminal charges: Mailbox pipe bombing

Lucas John Helder (born May 5, 1981) also known as the Midwest Pipe Bomber, is a former University of Wisconsin–Stout student from Pine Island, Minnesota, known for being the suspect in a series of pipe bombings.

He was arrested in 2002 as a suspect in pipe bombings in mailboxes, which injured several people. In 2004, he was found mentally incompetent to stand trial and is still incarcerated in a federal medical facility.

== Bombings ==
In 2002, while attending the UW–Stout, Helder planned to plant pipe bombs in mailboxes across the United States to create a smiley face shape on the United States map. The bombs, which were packed with BBs and nails, were rigged to explode as the mailboxes were opened. Completed and rigged bombs were found in Nebraska, Colorado, Texas, Illinois and Iowa. In Iowa, six people, including four mail carriers, were injured when the bombs detonated. Ultimately, Helder planted 18 bombs and covered 3,200 miles (5,100 km).

He was stopped by police in Nebraska, Oklahoma, and Colorado for speeding and failure to wear a seat belt, but was not arrested. Eventually he was captured in rural Nevada before he managed to complete the full smile. At the time of his arrest, police were looking for an unknown suspect driving a black Honda Accord. Many newspapers reported that he was wearing a Kurt Cobain T-shirt. When he was intercepted after a 40-mile car chase, Helder held a gun to his head, but was convinced to lower it by Federal Bureau of Investigation negotiators. Law enforcement discovered more IEDs in his vehicle. The bombings were widely covered by the US news media.

== Personality, writings and theories ==
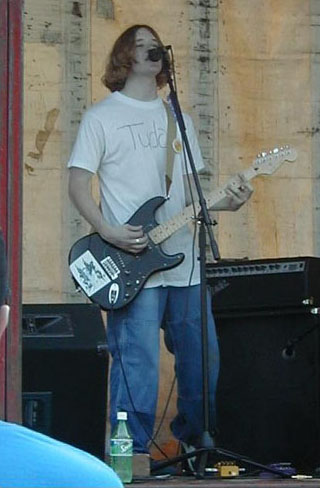
Helder performing with Apathy in his hometown of Pine Island, Minnesota

Helder was not at the top of his college class, but his professors described him as a reasonably good, quiet and polite student, and at first there was confusion as to what the motivation for the bombings could be. Family, friends, and many acquaintances referred to Helder as normal and without a propensity to hurt people. But his roommate noted that Helder had recently become obsessed with death, had begun smoking marijuana, and had been reciting extended monologues about his new spiritual beliefs to his friends (which they had mostly "laughed off").

Within the year prior to his arrest, Helder had become passionate about astral projection techniques and came to believe that death of the flesh and body is not the end of existence, as evidenced by the manifesto he sent to The Badger Herald of the University of Wisconsin–Madison at the beginning of the bombing spree. The essay also includes statements such as:

"I'm taking very drastic measure in attempt to provide this information to you... I will die/change in the end for this, but that's ok, hahaha paradise awaits! I'm dismissing a few individuals from reality, to change all of you for the better"

Notes attached to the bombs denounced government control over daily lives, denied that anyone who had died was really dead, and promised more of the same kind of message.

== Trial ==
In April 2004, a federal judge found Helder incompetent to stand trial. While a judge could free Helder if doctors find he is not a threat to society, legal experts doubt this possibility due to the violent nature of his crimes. He has been diagnosed with schizoaffective disorder.

In 2013, a federal judge ordered Helder re-evaluated for competency to stand trial. Helder remains incarcerated in the Federal Medical Center in Rochester, Minnesota, as of March 2025, with BOP Register Number 36460-048.

== Musical background ==
Sacks of People

Studio album by Apathy
- Released: 2001
- Studio: Last Minute Records
- Genres: Alternative Rock; Grunge
- Length: 43:54
- Producer: Michael Thompson

Prior to his bombing spree, Helder was a member of Apathy, a Rochester, Minnesota, three-piece grunge band. Although the band was successful only on a local scale, they recorded a CD, Sacks of People, at the end of their first summer together. They funded and released the album themselves. Helder was a fan of Kurt Cobain. He heavily decorated his dorm room with Nirvana posters and ephemera. A bandmate in Apathy remarked Helder had "an interesting style of singing" and would write much of the lyrics of the group's tracks, not having a full understanding of their meaning.

When the news broke that Helder was the pipe bomber, the media made significant mention of his status as a musician.

== See also ==
- Improvised explosive device
- Ted Kaczynski
- Austin serial bombings
- October 2018 United States mail bombing attempts
