= William Bruce Dickey =

American politician (1842–1902)

William Bruce Dickey (February 13, 1842 – November 2, 1902) was an American businessman and politician.

Dickey was born in Smithfield, Madison County, New York. He moved to Minnesota in 1859 and settled in Zumbrota, Goodhue County, Minnesota with his wife and family. Dickey was involved with the mercantile business. Dickey served in the 8th Minnesota Infantry Regiment during the American Civil War and was commissioned a first lieutenant. Dickey served in the Minnesota Senate from 1899 until his death in 1902. He died in Thief River Falls, Minnesota.
