= Leon Township, Goodhue County, Minnesota =

Leon Township, Minnesota
- Township
- Location within the state of Minnesota Leon Township, Minnesota (the United States)
- Coordinates: 44°24′19″N 92°51′41″W
- Country: United States
- State: Minnesota
- County: Goodhue

Area
  - Total: 37.8 sq mi (98.0 km^{2})
  - Land: 37.8 sq mi (97.9 km^{2})
  - Water: 0.039 sq mi (0.1 km^{2})
- Elevation: 1,194 ft (364 m)

Population (2000)
  - Total: 942
  - Density: 25/sq mi (9.6/km^{2})
- Time zone: UTC-6 (Central (CST))
  - Summer (DST): UTC-5 (CDT)
- FIPS code: 27-36476
- GNIS feature ID: 0664755
- Website: https://www.leontwpgoodhuecomn.gov/

Leon Township is a township in Goodhue County, Minnesota, United States. The population was 942 at the 2000 census.

== History ==
Leon Township was organized in 1858, and was probably named after the Kingdom of León.

== Geography ==
According to the United States Census Bureau, the township has a total area of 37.8 square miles (98 km^{2}), of which 37.8 square miles (98 km^{2}) is land and 0.04 square miles (0.10 km^{2}) (0.11%) is water.

=== Major highway ===
- U.S. Highway 52

=== Unincorporated community ===
Settled in 1856, Wastedo is a small, unincorporated community located within Leon Township. The community had a post office from 1857 to 1903, and a station of the Chicago Great Western Railroad.

Today, Wastedo has a school located off U.S. Highway 52.

== Demographics ==
As of the census of 2000, there were 942 people, 322 households, and 272 families residing in the township. The population density was 24.9 inhabitants per square mile (9.6/km^{2}). There were 331 housing units at an average density of 8.8 per square mile (3.4/km^{2}). The racial makeup of the township was 98.51% White, 0.21% Native American, 0.11% Asian, 0.11% from other races, and 1.06% from two or more races. Hispanic or Latino of any race were 0.74% of the population.

There were 322 households, out of which 39.1% had children under the age of 18 living with them, 77.3% were married couples living together, 2.2% had a female householder with no husband present, and 15.5% were non-families. 12.7% of all households were made up of individuals, and 4.7% had someone living alone who was 65 years of age or older. The average household size was 2.93 and the average family size was 3.21.

In the township the population was spread out, with 28.8% under the age of 18, 6.7% from 18 to 24, 29.1% from 25 to 44, 27.3% from 45 to 64, and 8.2% who were 65 years of age or older. The median age was 39 years. For every 100 females, there were 105.2 males. For every 100 females age 18 and over, there were 115.8 males.

The median income for a household in the township was $61,094, and the median income for a family was $62,422. Males had a median income of $40,655 versus $26,528 for females. The per capita income for the township was $25,756. About 3.9% of families and 3.8% of the population were below the poverty line, including 2.4% of those under age 18 and 5.4% of those age 65 or over.
