= Greg Preslicka =

American artists and graphic designer

Greg Preslicka (born May 25, 1965) is an American artist and graphic designer best known for his vibrant murals and community-focused art installations across the Upper Midwest, particularly in Minnesota, Iowa, South Dakota, and Wisconsin.

== Early life and education ==
Preslicka grew up in New Prague, Minnesota, where he delveloped a passion for art. He attended the Minneapolis College of Art and Design and took up an interest in graphic design and illustration, before transferring to the College of Visual Arts in St. Paul, earning a degree in Communication Arts. Initially pursuing a career in graphic design, followed by painting murals, and finally developing family games. Preslicka is also known for plein air oil painting, capturing landscapes and small-town scenes, especially along Minnesota's North Shore.

Preslicka has five children.

== Career and artistic style ==
Preslicka began working as a graphic designer in the late 1980s for studios and started his own Preslica Studios in the early 1990s. He also became a member of the Savage Art Studios and works on plein air paintings. He began painting murals in the bedrooms of his own children, and then started painting murals for other children in their bedrooms for more income. He started a new business venture called The Big Picture in to bring art into homes, doing his first wall mural in 2008. Preslicka has created murals in schools, libraries, community centers, medical offices, government buildings, and more throughout Minnesota and Wisconsin. Preslicka is a devoted outdoor painter, even working outside in below-zero temperatures, and coordinated the competition aspects of an open-air painting contest in Shakopee, Minnesota in 2012. Preslicka has done work for clients including General Mills, Nabisco, Malt-O-Meal, 3M, Hormel Foods, and International Dairy Queen, and created the logos for Scott County, Minnesota and the cities of Savage, Minnesota and Burnsville, Minnesota. Preslicka says that his mural work grew as a sideline to his graphic design work. Preslicka was involved a live painting challenge conducted at 12 locations in Scott County on November 26, 2016, and went on to host an art show and sale at his home studio. Preslicka donated four murals to the Crisis Nursery for free to help the mood of children staying there. Preslicka announced in 2021 his partnership with the Seymour Agency to illustrate children's books.

Preslicka frequently works with casein paint in his plein air paintings. His subjects often include small towns, main streets, storefronts, and locations along Minnesota's North Shore. In 2017, his plein air and studio work was featured in Minnesota Conservation Volunteer magazine, which increased recognition of his work within the state.

Preslicka's professional journey began as a graphic designer, collaborating with notable companies such as General Mills, Dairy Queen, Hormel, and 3M.

In 2008, with support from his wife and business partner, Heidi, he began creating murals. Heidi helped secure his first commercial mural commission at the YMCA in Burnsville, Minnesota, and facilitated local media coverage through Thisweek Live, a South Metro video news outlet, with a report by Tad Johnson.

Since then, Preslicka has completed over 120 murals throughout the region. His projects are located in public spaces such as libraries, schools, and community centers. His mural style includes painterly and whimsical elements and frequently incorporates community involvement, particularly in educational environments.

Examples of his work include a mural at the Savage Public Library titled Take Flight, which features imaginative characters and scenes, and a mural for the NRHEG School District that includes representations of local downtowns and the school mascot to highlight community identity.

Preslicka also participates in Artist in Residence programs, collaborating with students to produce large-scale murals. In one such project at the Marshalltown Community School District, he worked with first-grade students to create a tile mural installation at the district's Welcome Center, focusing on themes of diversity and inclusion.

== Board game design and inventions ==
Preslicka co-founded HG Game Worx, focusing on designing and licensing creative, family friendly tabletop games. Their creations include "Balance Blast Off" (licensed to Fisher-Price), "Stink Bug" (licensed to Winning Moves and Outset), "Amoeba" (licensed to IDW and Martinex), "Hot Words" (licensed to Spin Master), "Yogarrr!" (licensed to MGA), "Chicken War" (licensed to ThinkFun), and "Intergalactic Plumber" (licensed to Outset). Greg and Heidi continue to work on creating and selling their games.

== Community engagement and outreach ==
Preslicka is deeply involved in community service, donating murals to various organizations, including the Make-A-Wish Foundation, Minneapolis Crisis Nursery, and Peter & Paul Community Services in St. Louis. His work aims to provide comfort and joy to children and families in need. For example, his murals at the Greater Minneapolis Crisis Nursery feature vibrant, child-friendly themes to create a welcoming environment for children in crisis.

== Personal life ==
Preslicka resides in Savage, Minnesota, with his wife, Heidi, who manages the business portion of his art career. Preslicka continues doing murals, games and paints en plein air, capturing the natural beauty of Minnesota's landscapes, and occasionally sells his works from his home studio.

== Selected murals ==
- Rochester Public Library (Rochester, MN): A 250-foot mural depicting the city's cultural diversity.
- Pioneer Park Mural (Park Rapids, MN): A mural celebrating the natural beauty of the Northwoods.
- NRHEG School District Mural (New Richland, MN): A mural illustrating the unity of the district's communities.
- Marshalltown Community School District
- City of Savage Public Library
- Van Horn/Zumbrota Public Libraries One of his first public murals: (Pine Island, MN & Zumbrota, MN)
- City of Perham

== Awards and honors ==
- Honored for Exemplary Citizenship for donating logo/identity system for the City of Savage (March 2000).
- Tettegouche State Park, Solo Art Exhibition, Titled "ReCollections"
- Jordan's Day of Creativity, Featured Artist 2018
- Featured in the Minnesota Conservation Volunteer Magazine: (2017)

== Outreach and contributions ==
- Savage Arts Council (SAC) - 2006 to 2013 Founding member, Co-Chair and Board Member
- Outdoor Painters of Minnesota - 2004 to Present - Founding member, Coordinator 2006 to 2010
- Minnesota River Arts Fair Plein Air Painting Competition - Summer 2013, 2014, 2015 Coordinated and Managed the event.
- Summer Art Class - 2007, 2006, 2005 Taught Cartooning, Drawing, Illustration for ages 10 to 13.
- Art Masterpiece/Art Adventure - 2000 to 2013 - St. Michael School, Grades K-4]
- Career Day Presentations/Critiques, New Prague/Prior Lake High School - 2025, 2020, 2018
- Career Presentation, School of Environmental Studies, Apple Valley, Minnesota – 2019

== Preslicka mural donations ==
- Minneapolis Crisis Nursery (Donated 4 murals for children's sleeping rooms 2016, 2015) Star Tribune
- St. Michael School (Mural donations)
- YMCA International (Mural donation 2010)
- Make A Wish Foundation (Mural donations 2014)

== Preslicka other painting donations ==
- City of Savage (Painting Donation 2016): Framed & Matted under glass 13" x 16"
- City of Jordan (Painting Donation 2016): Framed & Matted under glass 13" x 16"
- New Prague Historical Society Painting Donation 2016 : Framed & Matted under glass 13" x 16"
- Wishes & More (Painting Donation 2016): Framed & Matted under glass 13" x 16"
- St. Croix Preparatory Academy (Painting Donation 2016): Framed & Matted under glass 13" x 16"
- St. John the Baptist Catholic Church (Painting Donation 2016): Framed & Matted under glass 13" x 16"
- CHWC U.S. Mission Trips (Painting Donations 2020, 2019, 2018, 2016, 2014, 2012, 2009)
- Peter & Paul Community Services, St. Louis, Missouri (Painting Donations 2018, 2019, 2020)
- St. Michael School Gala Dinner (Painting Donations 2012, 2008 and 2007) & St. Michael Church Large Retreat Painting
