= Zumbrota Public Library =

Coordinates: 53.27835°N 88.33008°W

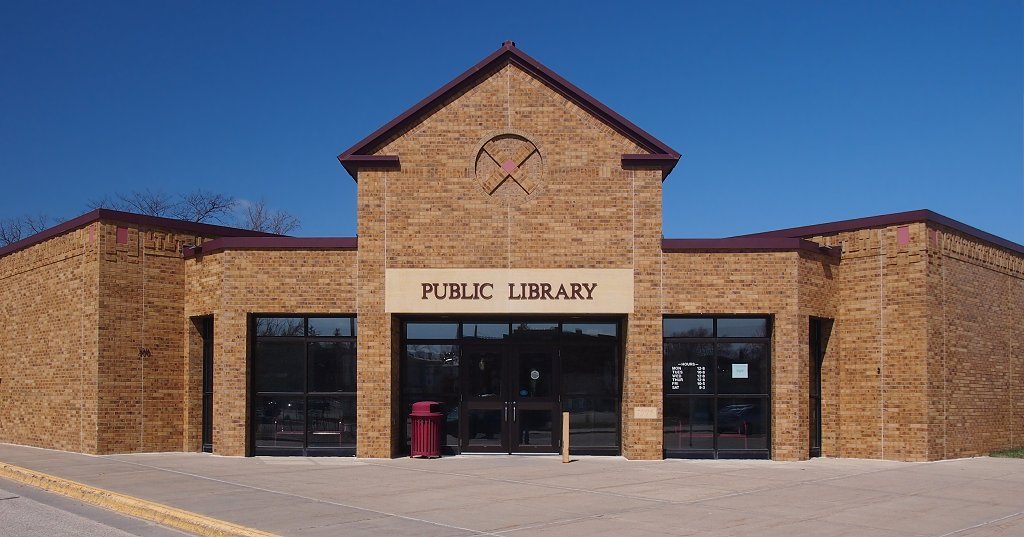
- Zumbrota Public Library
- Location: 100 West Avenue; Zumbrota MN 55992
- Established: 1877

Collection
- Size: 51,000

Access and use
- Circulation: 120,000
- Members: 4,000

Other information
- Director: James Hill
- Website: http://www.zumbrota.info/

The Zumbrota Public Library is a library in Zumbrota, Minnesota, United States. It is a member of Southeastern Libraries Cooperating, the Southeast Minnesota library region. The Zumbrota Public Library was the first tax-supported library in the state of Minnesota. It is a mid-size public library, located in the city of Zumbrota, 50 miles (80 km) south of Minneapolis–Saint Paul on the Highway 52 corridor. Over 4,000 people are registered borrowers. The collection has approximately 51,000 items on file, with an annual circulation of approximately 120,000 items.

== History ==
The Zumbrota Public Library's origins can be traced back to 1868 when settlers of the new town came together to share their books and provide entertainment. They soon grew tired of the same small collection of books and the Zumbrota Literary Society and Library Association was formed to acquire new books and maintain a library. Lifetime membership for a family could be purchased for the sum of fifteen dollars. In May 1877, the library became the Free Public Library of Zumbrota after Zumbrota became an incorporated village and agreed to support the library by a one mill tax. It was the first public library in Minnesota.

In the early years, the library moved around as it struggled to find a permanent home. It was once located above a general store, in a millinery establishment, and in a bank. The library was able to secure a grant of 6,500 dollars from Andrew Carnegie and in May 1908 the library finally had a place of its own. The Carnegie Library, the smallest one in the state, at the corner of East Avenue and 3rd St. was home to the library for 87 years. The building suffered some minor damage in 1924 when the adjoining village hall was destroyed in a fire. In 1995, the library moved to a new 10,400 sq. ft. building on 100 West Avenue.

In 1971, the Zumbrota Public Library became a part of Southeastern Libraries Cooperating (SELCO), which is a regional public library system for Southeastern Minnesota.
