= Whisky Creek (Touchet River tributary) =

Stream in Washington, U.S.

Coordinates: 46°16′22″N 118°07′06″W

Whisky Creek is a stream in the U.S. state of Washington. It is a tributary of the Touchet River.

Whisky Creek most likely was named for two local men who sold whiskey to Indians.

== See also ==
- List of rivers of Washington (state)
