= Zumbrota, Minnesota =

City in Minnesota, United States

Zumbrota
- City
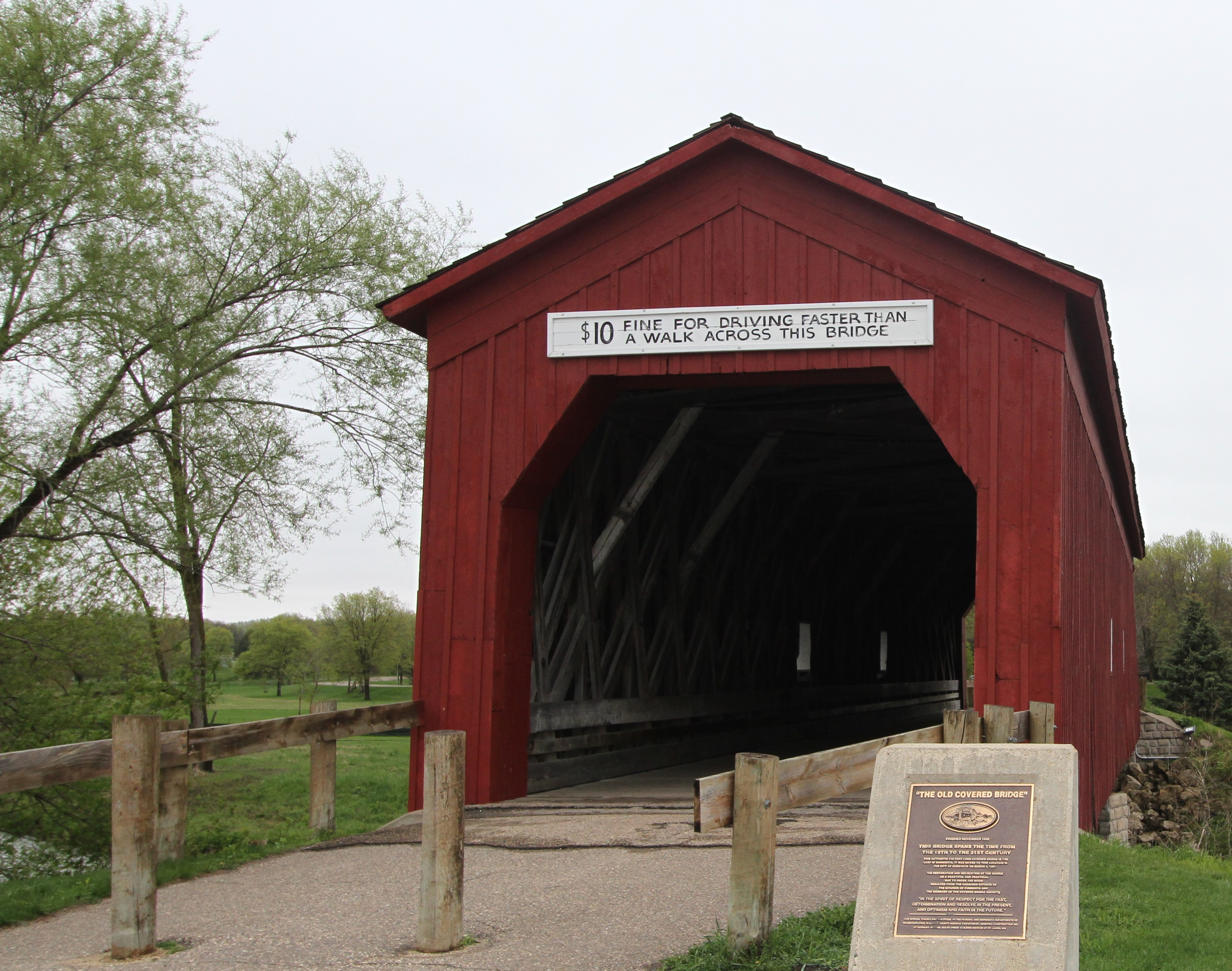
- Zumbrota Covered Bridge
- Motto: "Bridging the Past and the Future"
- Location of Zumbrota, Minnesota
- Coordinates: 44°17′34″N 92°40′18″W
- Country: United States
- State: Minnesota
- County: Goodhue

Area
  - Total: 2.83 sq mi (7.33 km^{2})
  - Land: 2.82 sq mi (7.31 km^{2})
  - Water: 0.0077 sq mi (0.02 km^{2})
- Elevation: 991 ft (302 m)

Population (2020)
  - Total: 3,726
  - Density: 1,320.1/sq mi (509.69/km^{2})
- Time zone: UTC-6 (Central (CST))
  - Summer (DST): UTC-5 (CDT)
- ZIP Code: 55992
- Area code: 507
- FIPS code: 27-72328
- GNIS ID: 0654511
- Website: ci.zumbrota.mn.us

Zumbrota is a city in Goodhue County, Minnesota, United States, along the North Fork of the Zumbro River. The population was 3,726 at the 2020 census. It promotes itself as "the only Zumbrota in the world."

== History ==
Zumbrota was claimed as a town in 1856 by Joseph Bailey and D.B. Goddard. The name Zumbrota appears to have resulted from a corruption of the French name for the local Zumbro River, Rivière des Embarras (Obstruction River), coupled with the Dakota toŋ (village).

Zumbrota is home to the Zumbrota Covered Bridge, the last functioning covered bridge in the state of Minnesota. It was originally installed in 1869, one year before the arrival of railroads to the area. The bridge is listed on the National Register of Historic Places.

The Zumbrota Public Library was the first tax-supported library in Minnesota.

The city of Zumbrota celebrated its sesquicentennial in 2006.

== Geography ==
According to the United States Census Bureau, the city has an area of 2.68 square miles (6.94 km^{2}), of which 2.67 square miles (6.92 km^{2}) is land and 0.01 square miles (0.03 km^{2}) is water.

U.S. Route 52 and Minnesota State Highways 58 and 60 are the three main highways in the city.

=== Climate ===
Climate data for Zumbrota, Minnesota, 1991–2020 normals, extremes 1895–present
Month	Jan	Feb	Mar	Apr	May	Jun	Jul	Aug	Sep	Oct	Nov	Dec	Year
Record high °F (°C)	58 (14)	69 (21)	83 (28)	92 (33)	106 (41)	103 (39)	109 (43)	105 (41)	102 (39)	92 (33)	78 (26)	66 (19)	109 (43)
Mean maximum °F (°C)	41.3 (5.2)	46.2 (7.9)	64.0 (17.8)	78.6 (25.9)	87.0 (30.6)	90.8 (32.7)	91.2 (32.9)	89.4 (31.9)	86.5 (30.3)	80.4 (26.9)	62.9 (17.2)	46.8 (8.2)	93.4 (34.1)
Mean daily maximum °F (°C)	22.7 (−5.2)	27.3 (−2.6)	40.4 (4.7)	55.3 (12.9)	67.2 (19.6)	77.3 (25.2)	81.0 (27.2)	78.6 (25.9)	71.9 (22.2)	58.7 (14.8)	41.9 (5.5)	28.3 (−2.1)	54.2 (12.3)
Daily mean °F (°C)	13.4 (−10.3)	17.3 (−8.2)	30.5 (−0.8)	44.4 (6.9)	56.4 (13.6)	66.8 (19.3)	70.5 (21.4)	68.0 (20.0)	60.4 (15.8)	47.4 (8.6)	32.7 (0.4)	20.0 (−6.7)	44.0 (6.7)
Mean daily minimum °F (°C)	4.1 (−15.5)	7.3 (−13.7)	20.6 (−6.3)	33.5 (0.8)	45.5 (7.5)	56.3 (13.5)	60.1 (15.6)	57.5 (14.2)	48.8 (9.3)	36.0 (2.2)	23.5 (−4.7)	11.7 (−11.3)	33.7 (1.0)
Mean minimum °F (°C)	−19.8 (−28.8)	−13.9 (−25.5)	−3.7 (−19.8)	18.7 (−7.4)	30.6 (−0.8)	41.4 (5.2)	48.3 (9.1)	46.2 (7.9)	32.8 (0.4)	21.1 (−6.1)	7.3 (−13.7)	−11.6 (−24.2)	−22.1 (−30.1)
Record low °F (°C)	−45 (−43)	−41 (−41)	−36 (−38)	−1 (−18)	19 (−7)	22 (−6)	37 (3)	32 (0)	18 (−8)	3 (−16)	−20 (−29)	−40 (−40)	−45 (−43)
Average precipitation inches (mm)	0.99 (25)	1.03 (26)	1.85 (47)	3.34 (85)	4.19 (106)	5.33 (135)	4.12 (105)	4.89 (124)	3.92 (100)	2.56 (65)	1.77 (45)	1.20 (30)	35.19 (893)
Average snowfall inches (cm)	10.5 (27)	9.5 (24)	6.2 (16)	3.3 (8.4)	0.5 (1.3)	0.0 (0.0)	0.0 (0.0)	0.0 (0.0)	0.0 (0.0)	0.6 (1.5)	3.0 (7.6)	9.9 (25)	43.5 (110.8)
Average precipitation days (≥ 0.01 in)	6.3	5.4	7.2	9.9	11.4	11.0	8.9	8.7	8.4	8.8	6.2	6.4	98.6
Average snowy days (≥ 0.1 in)	5.3	4.3	2.8	1.3	0.1	0.0	0.0	0.0	0.0	0.5	1.9	4.5	20.7
Source 1: NOAA
Source 2: National Weather Service

== Demographics ==
Historical population
Census	Pop.	Note	%±
1880	797		—
1890	867		8.8%
1900	1,119		29.1%
1910	1,138		1.7%
1920	1,265		11.2%
1930	1,350		6.7%
1940	1,386		2.7%
1950	1,686		21.6%
1960	1,830		8.5%
1970	1,929		5.4%
1980	2,129		10.4%
1990	2,312		8.6%
2000	2,789		20.6%
2010	3,252		16.6%
2020	3,726		14.6%
U.S. Decennial Census

=== 2020 census ===
As of the 2020 census, Zumbrota had a population of 3,726. The median age was 39.4 years. 25.7% of residents were under the age of 18 and 17.6% of residents were 65 years of age or older. For every 100 females there were 91.7 males, and for every 100 females age 18 and over there were 88.0 males age 18 and over.

0.0% of residents lived in urban areas, while 100.0% lived in rural areas.

There were 1,503 households in Zumbrota, of which 33.9% had children under the age of 18 living in them. Of all households, 51.2% were married-couple households, 15.6% were households with a male householder and no spouse or partner present, and 25.8% were households with a female householder and no spouse or partner present. About 28.6% of all households were made up of individuals and 13.7% had someone living alone who was 65 years of age or older.

There were 1,585 housing units, of which 5.2% were vacant. The homeowner vacancy rate was 2.5% and the rental vacancy rate was 8.1%.

Racial composition as of the 2020 census
Race	Number	Percent
White	3,451	92.6%
Black or African American	29	0.8%
American Indian and Alaska Native	14	0.4%
Asian	36	1.0%
Native Hawaiian and Other Pacific Islander	6	0.2%
Some other race	54	1.4%
Two or more races	136	3.7%
Hispanic or Latino (of any race)	95	2.5%

=== 2010 census ===
As of the 2010 Census, there were 3,252 people, 1,349 households, and 882 families living in the city. The population density was 1,218.0 inhabitants per square mile (470.3/km^{2}). There were 1,437 housing units at an average density of 538.2 per square mile (207.8/km^{2}). The racial makeup of the city was 95.8% White, 0.7% African American, 0.5% Native American, 0.7% Asian, 0.6% from other races, and 1.7% from two or more races. Hispanic or Latino of any race were 1.6% of the population.

There were 1,349 households, of which 34.4% had children under the age of 18 living with them, 51.4% were married couples living together, 9.8% had a female householder with no husband present, 4.2% had a male householder with no wife present, and 34.6% were non-families. 30.5% of all households were made up of individuals, and 14.7% had someone living alone who was 65 years of age or older. The average household size was 2.37 and the average family size was 2.96.

The median age in the city was 38.2 years. 26.7% of residents were under the age of 18; 5.5% were between the ages of 18 and 24; 26.3% were from 25 to 44; 25.7% were from 45 to 64; and 16% were 65 years of age or older. The gender makeup of the city was 46.8% male and 53.2% female.

=== 2000 census ===
At the 2000 Census, there were 2,789 people, 1,141 households, and 741 families living in the city. The population density was 1,412.6 inhabitants per square mile (545.4/km^{2}). There were 1,191 housing units at an average density of 603.2 per square mile (232.9/km^{2}). The racial makeup of the city was 96.38% White, 0.82% African American, 0.14% Native American, 0.65% Asian, 0.04% Pacific Islander, 1.18% from other races, and 0.79% from two or more races. Hispanic or Latino of any race were 1.47% of the population.

There were 1,141 households, out of which 32.9% had children under the age of 18 living with them, 54.4% were married couples living together, 7.9% had a female householder with no husband present, and 35.0% were non-families. 31.5% of all households were made up of individuals, and 16.1% had someone living alone who was 65 years of age or older. The average household size was 2.40 and the average family size was 3.04.

In the city, the population was spread out, with 26.6% under the age of 18, 7.2% from 18 to 24, 29.4% from 25 to 44, 18.5% from 45 to 64, and 18.3% who were 65 years of age or older. The median age was 37 years. For every 100 females, there were 88.4 males. For every 100 females age 18 and over, there were 85.8 males.

The median income for a household in the city was $41,678, and the median income for a family was $53,750. Males had a median income of $34,821 versus $25,647 for females. The per capita income for the city was $22,786. About 6.6% of families and 8.0% of the population were below the poverty line, including 10.7% of those under age 18 and 13.1% of those age 65 or over.

== Religion ==
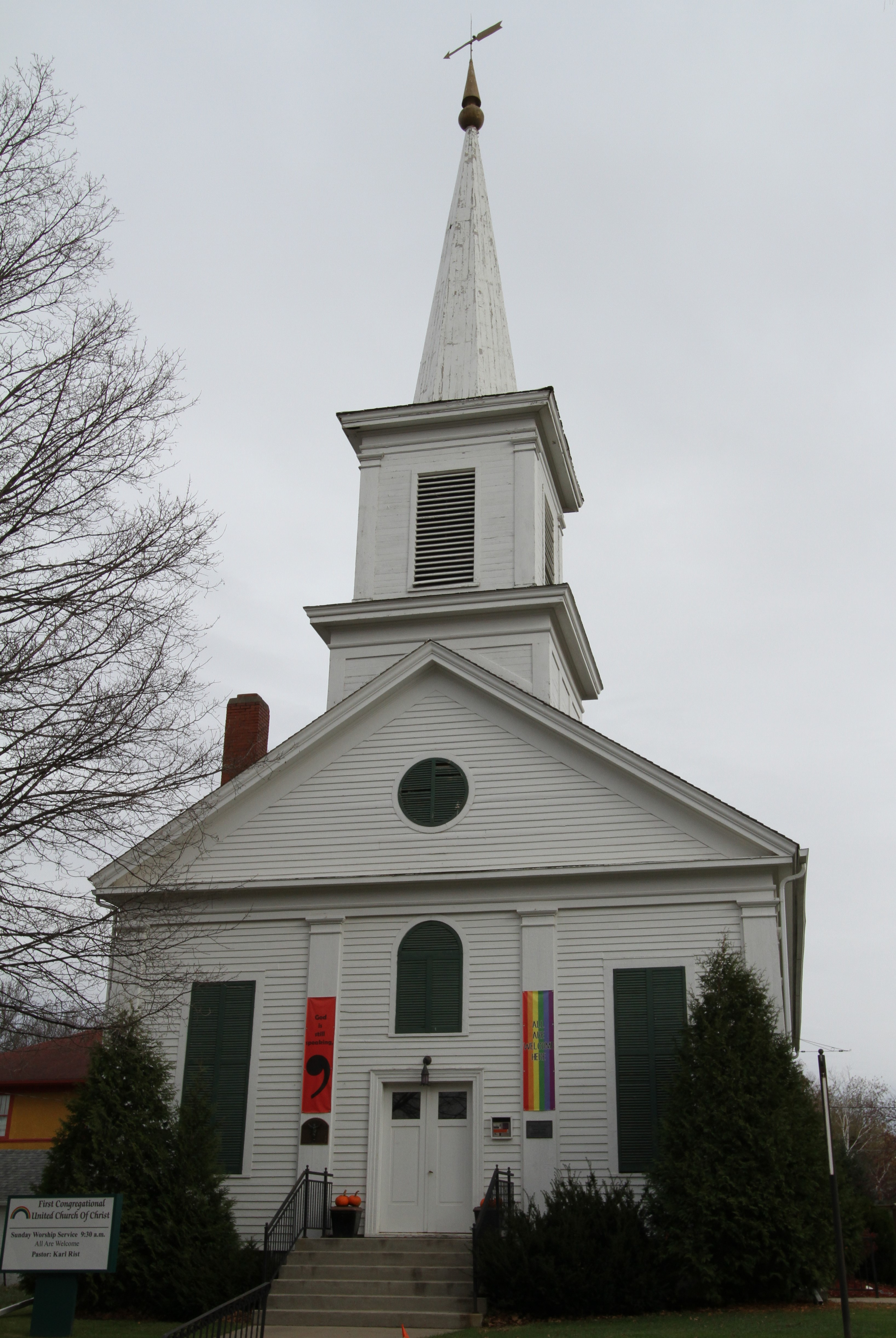
First Congregational, listed on the National Register of Historic Places

Christ Lutheran Church is a member of the Wisconsin Evangelical Lutheran Synod (WELS) in Zumbrota. United Redeemer Lutheran Church and Land's Lutheran Church are member churches of the Evangelical Lutheran Church in America (ELCA) in Zumbrota.

St. Paul's Catholic Church and First Congregational United Church of Christ, a member of the United Church of Christ (UCC), are also in Zumbrota.

== Education ==
Zumbrota-Mazeppa High School was established when the Zumbrota Public Schools and the Mazeppa Public Schools merged in 1987. The primary, middle, and high schools are all in Zumbrota while the elementary school is in Mazeppa.

Christ Lutheran School is a Christian elementary school (Pre-K-8) of the Wisconsin Evangelical Lutheran Synod (WELS) in Zumbrota.

== Parks and recreation ==
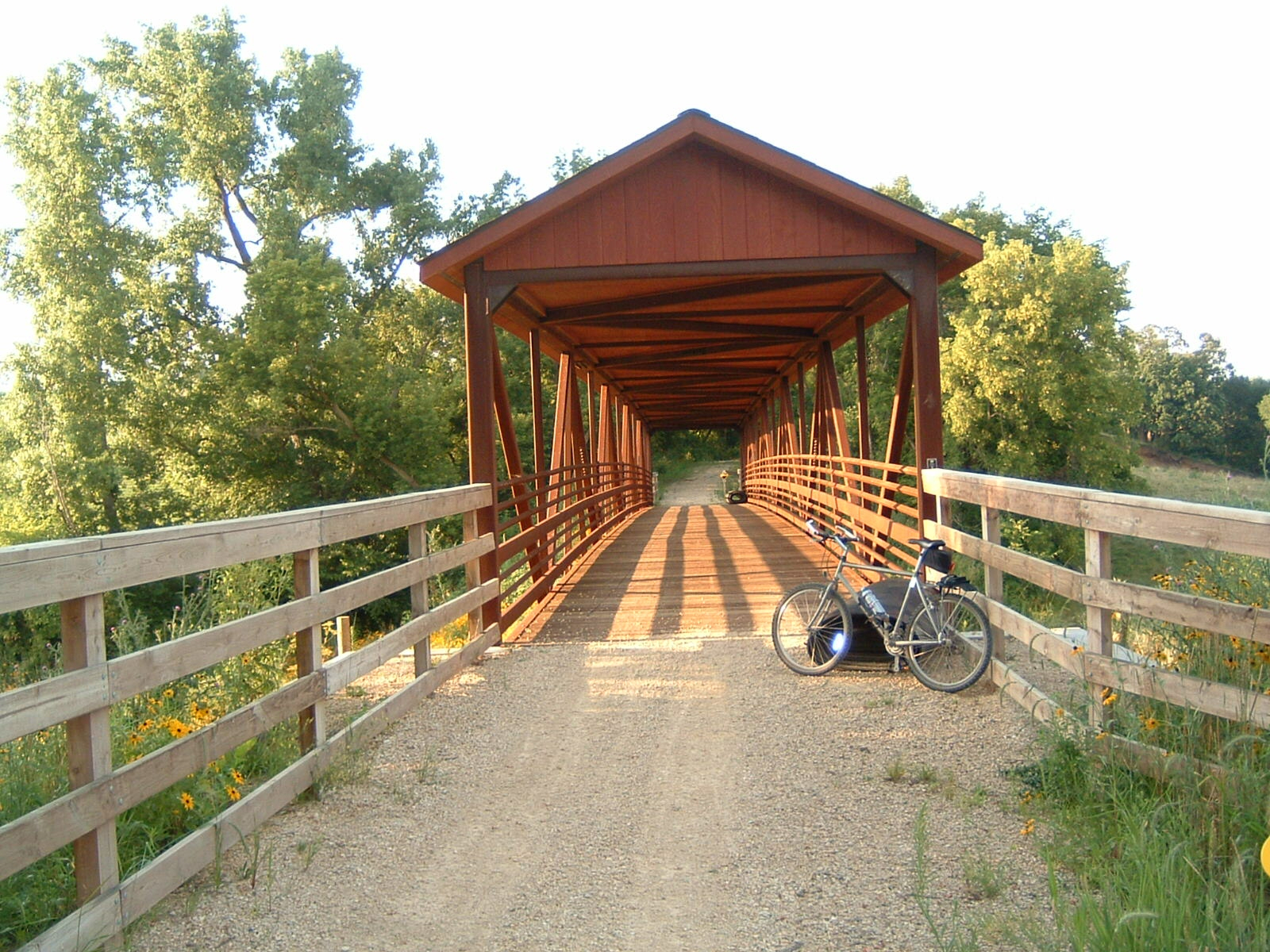
The bike trail in Zumbrota

Zumbrota's Covered Bridge Park features ball parks, bike trails, a swimming pool, a large kids play structure, camping, and the only authentic covered bridge in Minnesota. It also has a frisbee golf course, a skate park, and an ice rink during the winter.

== Festivals ==
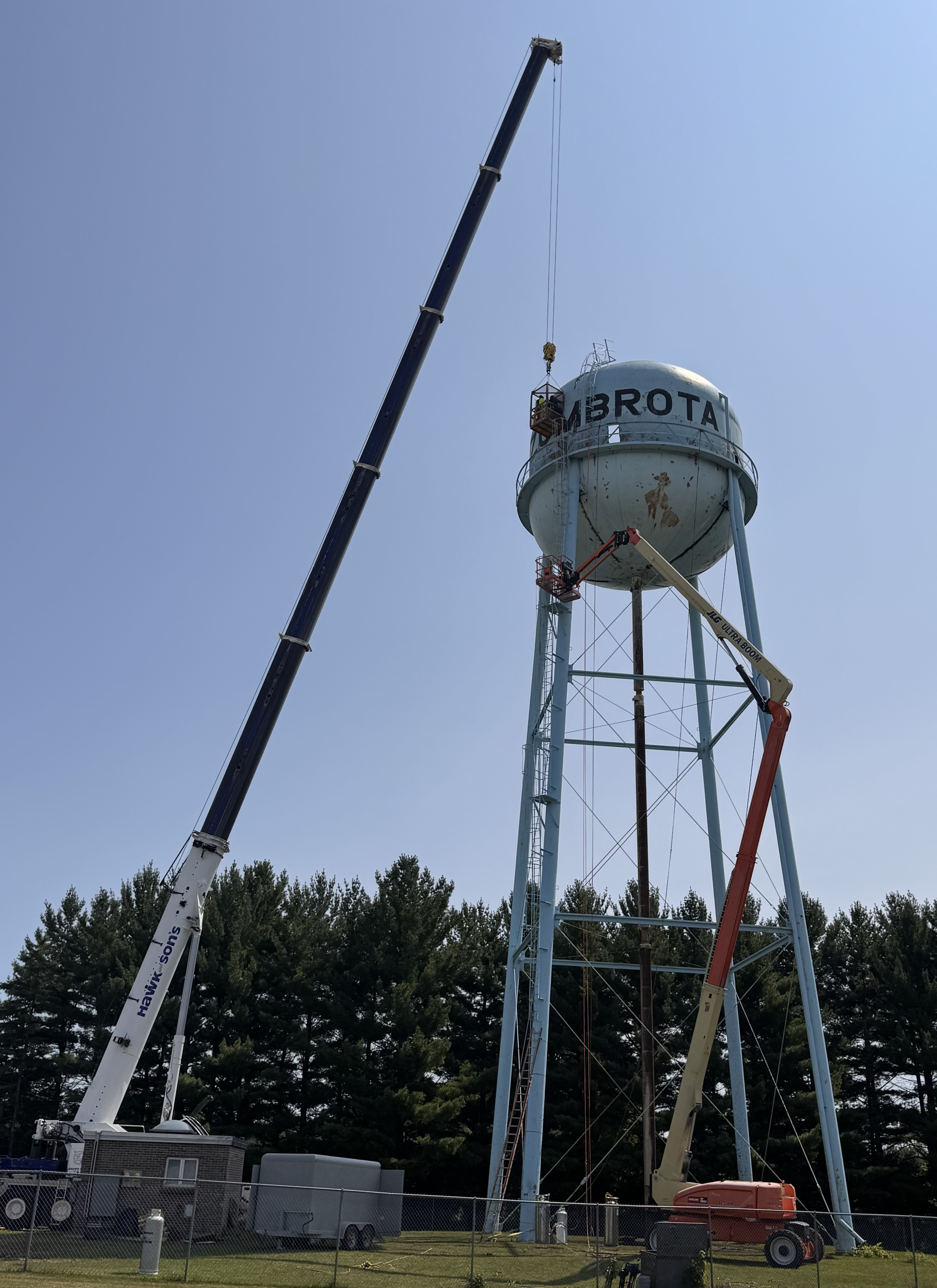
Deconstruction of the historic water tower in 2026

The Covered Bridge festival is an annual community wide festival held on the third weekend in September. It includes a grand parade, craft and vendor fair, food trucks, a fireworks festival, 5K/10K fun run and half marathon, and many more activities.

== Notable people ==
- Charles Clarence Beck, chief artist of the DC Comics book superhero Captain Marvel
- Paul Casey "Gus" Bradley, football coach for the NFL
- Kenneth O. Chilstrom, United States Air Force officer
- William Bruce Dickey, businessman and Minnesota state legislator
- Oliver J. Lee, businessman, educator, and Minnesota state legislator
- Genevieve Stearns, nutrition researcher
