= Whisky Creek (Red River of the North) =

Stream in Wilkin County, Minnesota, U.S.

Coordinates: 46°27′21″N 96°42′42″W

Whisky Creek is a stream in Wilkin County, in the U.S. state of Minnesota. It is a tributary of the Red River of the North.

Whisky Creek was so named for the fact bootleg whisky was sold near this creek.

== See also ==
- List of rivers of Minnesota
