= National Register of Historic Places listings in Wabasha County, Minnesota =

Location of Wabasha County in Minnesota

This is a list of the National Register of Historic Places listings in Wabasha County, Minnesota. It is intended to be a complete list of the properties and districts on the National Register of Historic Places in Wabasha County, Minnesota, United States. The locations of National Register properties and districts for which the latitude and longitude coordinates are included below, may be seen in an online map.

There are 25 properties and districts listed on the National Register in the county. A supplementary list includes one additional site that was formerly on the National Register.

This National Park Service list is complete through NPS recent listings posted September 12, 2025.

== Current listings ==
	Name on the Register	Image	Date listed	Location	City or town	Description
1	Bear Valley Grange Hall	Bear Valley Grange Hall	January 5, 1989 (#88003089)	County Road 3; 44°18′50″N 92°27′56″W	Zumbro Falls vicinity	Wabasha County's only surviving Grange hall—built in 1874—and a rare example of a chartered grange that built their own meeting hall rather than use an existing space.
2	Bridge No. 5827-Zumbro Falls	Bridge No. 5827-Zumbro Falls	June 29, 1998 (#98000684)	Minnesota 60 over a streambed 44°16′59″N 92°25′07″W	Zumbro Falls	1938 arch bridge built by the Works Progress Administration with a modular iron-plate substructure and masonry façade.
3	William H. and Alma Downer Campbell House	William H. and Alma Downer Campbell House	May 15, 1989 (#89000367)	211 W. 2nd St. 44°22′59″N 92°02′03″W	Wabasha	One of Wabasha's largest and most prominent houses when it was built overlooking downtown in 1874.
4	Lorenz and Lugerde Ginthner House	Lorenz and Lugerde Ginthner House	May 15, 1989 (#89000368)	130 W. 3rd St. 44°22′56″N 92°02′02″W	Wabasha	Elaborate 1882 Italianate house, the most intact and detailed example of the brick houses belonging to Wabasha's early merchant class.
5	Grace Memorial Episcopal Church	Grace Memorial Episcopal Church	February 4, 1982 (#82003062)	205 E. 3rd St. 44°22′53″N 92°01′53″W	Wabasha	Landmark 1900 English Gothic church designed by Cass Gilbert.
6	Hurd House-Anderson Hotel	Hurd House-Anderson Hotel	September 18, 1978 (#78001566)	333 W. Main St. 44°23′05″N 92°02′06″W	Wabasha	1856 hotel expanded in 1887, associated with the rapid commercial growth of Wabasha as a river and rail transportation hub. Also a contributing property to the Wabasha Commercial Historic District.
7	King Coulee Site	King Coulee Site	April 8, 1994 (#94000340)	Address restricted	Lake City vicinity	Largely undisturbed occupation site with intact stratigraphy and numerous biofacts stretching from the late Archaic period to the Oneota.
8	Lucas Kuehn House	Lucas Kuehn House	July 29, 1994 (#89000369)	306 E. Main St. 44°22′56″N 92°01′46″W	Wabasha	Wabasha's first Italianate house—built in 1878—and home of the town's leading 19th-century merchant.
9	Lake City and Rochester Stage Road-Mount Pleasant Section	Lake City and Rochester Stage Road-Mount Pleasant Section	August 30, 1991 (#91001063)	Along U.S. 63 southwest of Lake City; 44°24′07″N 92°20′23″W	Lake City vicinity	Short section of an 1858 stagecoach road funded by Lake City investors to increase trade with the state's interior; some of the first transportation infrastructure in southeastern Minnesota.
10	Lake City City Hall	Lake City City Hall	June 16, 1981 (#81000325)	205 W. Center St. 44°26′51″N 92°16′00″W	Lake City	1899 city hall, Lake City's most architecturally prominent public building and its longstanding government center.
11	Lake Zumbro Hydroelectric Generating Plant	Lake Zumbro Hydroelectric Generating Plant	March 14, 1991 (#91000243)	Along County Road 21 at the northern end of Lake Zumbro; 44°12′46″N 92°28′46″W	Mazeppa vicinity	Powerhouse and dam built 1917–1919, a representative work of pioneering early-20th-century hydroelectric engineer Hugh Lincoln Cooper (1865–1937), and the Minnesota native's only homestate project.
12	Patrick H. Rahilly House	Patrick H. Rahilly House	February 13, 1975 (#75001032)	34057 County Road 15; 44°24′39″N 92°21′03″W	Lake City vicinity	1880 home of one of southern Minnesota's first successful entrepreneurs and farmers. Also noted as an Italian Villa style residence unusually located in a rural setting. Boundary expanded March 2, 1979.
13	Reads Landing Overlook	Reads Landing Overlook	December 15, 2004 (#04001359)	U.S. 61; 44°24′36″N 92°06′27″W	Reads Landing vicinity	Scenic overlook of Lake Pepin built 1939–40, exemplifying Minnesota's early highway waysides built with federal work relief aid, the work of landscape architect Arthur R. Nichols, and National Park Service rustic design.
14	Reads Landing School	Reads Landing School	January 19, 1989 (#88003217)	3rd St. and 1st Ave. 44°24′04″N 92°04′46″W	Reads Landing	One of Minnesota's first brick schools—built in 1870—and a symbol of Reads Landing's peak as a lumber milling boomtown. Now the Wabasha County Historical Society Museum.
15	Clara and Julius Schmidt House	Clara and Julius Schmidt House	May 15, 1989 (#89000370)	418 E. 2nd St. 44°22′50″N 92°01′43″W	Wabasha	1888 Italianate example of the brick houses constructed by Wabasha's late-19th-century merchant class, one made particularly distinctive by its tinwork details.
16	Henry S. and Magdalena Schwedes House	Henry S. and Magdalena Schwedes House	May 15, 1989 (#89000371)	230 E. Main St. 44°22′56″N 92°01′47″W	Wabasha	1882 house typifying Italianate architecture in its peak year of popularity in Wabasha.
17	James C. and Agnes M. Stout House	James C. and Agnes M. Stout House	January 13, 1989 (#88003138)	310 S. Oak St. 44°26′46″N 92°15′58″W	Lake City	Exemplary Carpenter Gothic cottage built in 1872.
18	Swedish Evangelical Lutheran Church	Swedish Evangelical Lutheran Church	January 19, 1989 (#88003086)	Bridge St. 44°14′37″N 92°17′48″W	Millville	Small 1874 church and cemetery used successively by Swedish, Norwegian, and German congregations; Wabasha County's only intact surviving ethnic church from its peak of European immigration.
19	Alexander Thoirs House	Alexander Thoirs House	May 15, 1989 (#89000372)	329 W. 2nd St. 44°23′02″N 92°02′09″W	Wabasha	Wabasha's oldest surviving brick house—built in 1868 in Greek Revival style—and earliest example of the brick merchant houses that characterized the city's 19th-century architecture.
20	Wabasha Commercial Historic District	Wabasha Commercial Historic District	April 15, 1982 (#82003063)	Roughly along Main St. between Bridge and Bailey Aves. 44°23′02″N 92°01′58″W	Wabasha	Three-and-a-half block commercial district noted for its integrity of design and continuity of use, with 52 contributing properties built 1856–1928.
21	Wabasha County Poor House	Wabasha County Poor House	August 26, 1982 (#82003064)	Hiawatha Dr. 44°21′55″N 92°00′57″W	Wabasha	Rare intact example of Minnesota's county-run poorhouses, with an 1879 hospital and an 1883 residence hall.
22	Walnut Street Bridge	Walnut Street Bridge	January 15, 2003 (#02001705)	Western end of Walnut St. 44°16′23″N 92°32′55″W	Mazeppa	1904 Pratt truss bridge, an exceptionally ornamented work of notable Minnesota engineer William S. Hewett and his bridge building firm.
23	Weaver Mercantile Building	Weaver Mercantile Building	September 21, 1978 (#78001567)	U.S. 61 and Minnesota 74; 44°12′55″N 91°55′43″W	Weaver	Rare surviving commercial building—constructed in 1875—from Weaver's peak years as a river town. Also exhibits a form of commercial Italianate architecture popular along the Upper Mississippi River.
24	Williamson-Russell-Rahilly House	Williamson-Russell-Rahilly House	March 8, 1984 (#84001709)	304 Oak St. 44°26′46″N 92°15′59″W	Lake City	c. 1868 Greek Revival house given a 1910 Neoclassical remodeling; a particularly fine example of Minnesota's elegant, turn-of-the-20th-century architecture.
25	Zumbro Parkway Bridge	Zumbro Parkway Bridge	November 6, 1989 (#89001824)	County Road 68 over the Zumbro River; 44°16′47″N 92°25′20″W	Zumbro Falls	1937 double arch bridge with a modular iron-plate substructure and masonry façade, one of the finest examples of a style used in many of Minnesota's New Deal bridge projects.

== Former listings ==
	Name on the Register	Image	Date listed	Date removed	Location	City or town	Description
1	First Congregational Parsonage	First Congregational Parsonage	February 4, 1982 (#82003061)	March 4, 1992	305 W. 2nd St. (original address); Current coordinates are 44°22′02″N 92°02′38″W	Wabasha	1872 parsonage, one of Wabasha's finest frame Italianate buildings. Moved in 1987 for construction of the Wabasha–Nelson Bridge.

== See also ==
- List of National Historic Landmarks in Minnesota
- National Register of Historic Places listings in Minnesota
