= First Congregational Parsonage =

Historic house in Minnesota, United States

- Formerly listed on the U.S. National Register of Historic Places
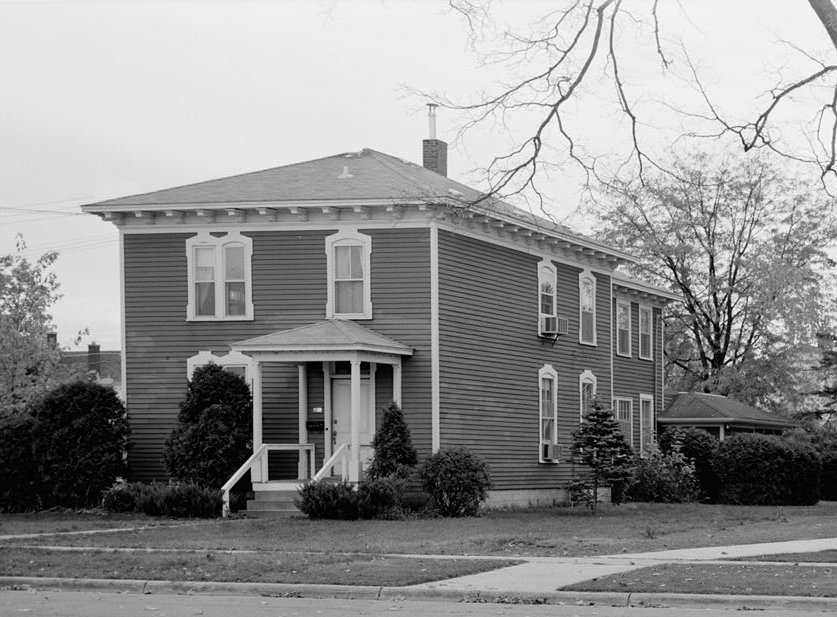
- First Congregational Parsonage in 1986

- Location within Minnesota Location within the United States
- Location: 100 Coulee Way, Wabasha, Minnesota
- Coordinates: 44°22′2.5″N 92°2′37.5″W
- Built: 1872
- Architectural style: Italianate
- NRHP reference No.: 82003061

Significant dates
- Added to NRHP: February 4, 1982
- Removed from NRHP: March 4, 1992

The First Congregational Parsonage is a former clergy house in Wabasha, Minnesota, United States. It was built in 1872 and listed on the National Register of Historic Places in 1982 for being one of the city's finest examples of a frame Italianate building. However, in 1987 it was moved from its original location at 305 Second Street West due to construction of the Wabasha–Nelson Bridge. Removed from its historic context in a riverfront residential district, the parsonage was delisted from the National Register in 1992.

== Description ==
The First Congregational Parsonage is a two-story frame building with a front wing and a slightly smaller rear wing. The cubiform front wing measures 26.5 by 31 feet (8.1 by 9.4 m) while the rear section measures 21 by 18 feet (6.4 by 5.5 m). The building has a low-pitched hip roof whose eaves are supported by evenly spaced brackets. Both sections have clapboard siding with corner boards.

The main wing has sash windows set in segmental arch wood surrounds with infill at the tops of the arches. The main entry is offset on the front façade, balanced by paired windows on the first and second floor. This doorway has a clear glass transom window. The main entrance originally had a decorative open porch, which was later replaced by a simpler porch with a hip roof and plain columns. What was originally the east side elevation has a cantilevered bay with a bracketed cornice on the first floor and a paired sash window on the second. The windows of the rear section are double-hung in simple wood frames.

== History ==
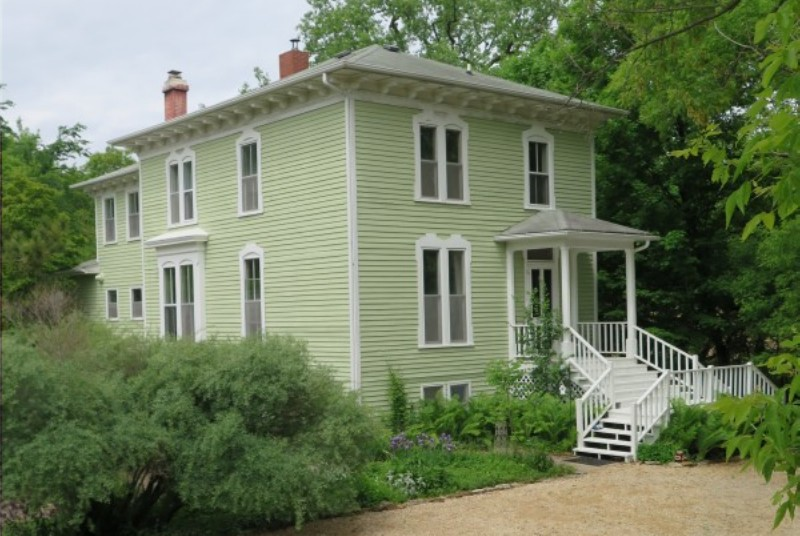
The First Congregational Parsonage on its current site

The First Congregational Parsonage was built in 1872 to house clergy for the adjacent Congregational Church of Wabasha. The congregation had been organized in February 1856, making it Wabasha's second-oldest religious group, and the church had been built in 1866. The parsonage's first occupant was Reverend C. K. Honeyman.

The building served as clergy housing until 1955, when it became a secular private home. The church officially sold the property in 1959, and it went through a succession of owners over the next two decades. In 1979 new owners Dr. Jay and Warya Greenberg had the interior remodeled to serve as a chiropractic clinic. It continued to serve in that function for the next seven years.

In 1986 the Minnesota Department of Transportation was building a new bridge to carry Minnesota State Highway 60 over the Mississippi River into Nelson, Wisconsin, and the First Congregational Parsonage was on property needed to build the bridge approach. The Department of Transportation worked with the Minnesota State Historic Preservation Office to move the historic building to a new site within Wabasha. The house was moved the following year to 100 Coulee Way.

In its new location it became a bed and breakfast known as the Cottonwood Inn. It was so named because it was adjacent to one of the largest cottonwood trees in Wabasha County.

== See also ==
- National Register of Historic Places listings in Wabasha County, Minnesota
