= Kuehn House =

Kuehn House may refer to:

- August Kuehn House, Evansville, Indiana
- Lucas Kuehn House, Wabasha, Minnesota
- Kuehn House (Florissant, Missouri), listed on the National Register of Historic Places

== See also ==
- Kuehn Blacksmith Shop-Hardware Store, Kaukauna, Wisconsin
- Andrew Kuehn Warehouse, Sioux Falls, South Dakota, listed on the National Register
- Kuehne-Schmidt Apartments, Kansas City, Missouri, listed on the National Register
