= Lorenz and Lugerde Ginthner House =

Historic house in Minnesota, United States

- U.S. National Register of Historic Places
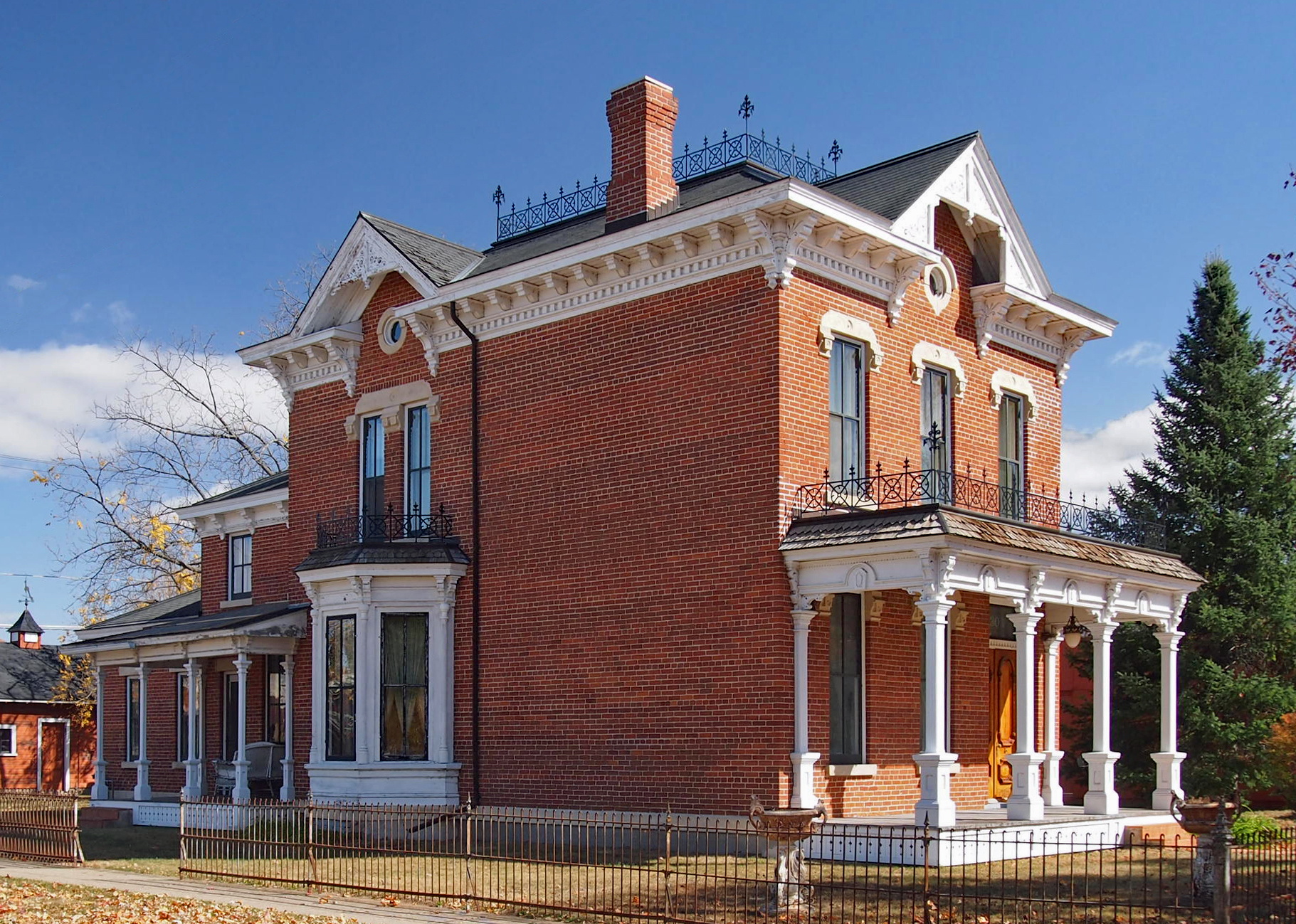
- The Lorenz and Lugerde Ginthner House from the west

- Location within Minnesota Location within the United States
- Location: 130 3rd Street West, Wabasha, Minnesota
- Coordinates: 44°22′56.2″N 92°2′2.4″W
- Area: Less than one acre
- Built: 1882
- Architectural style: Italianate
- MPS: Red Brick Houses in Wabasha, Minnesota, Associated with Merchant-Tradesmen MPS
- NRHP reference No.: 89000368
- Designated: May 15, 1989

The Lorenz and Lugerde Ginthner House is a historic house in Wabasha, Minnesota, United States. Built in 1882 in high Italianate style on a prominent corner lot, it was listed on the National Register of Historic Places in 1989. It is particularly notable for its elaborate Italianate architecture, and its status as the most intact, detailed example of the brick houses of Wabasha's early merchant class.

== Description ==
The Ginthner House is a brick building built on a limestone foundation. The main section rises two stories, with two sections at the rear dropping to one-and-a-half and one story respectively. All three sections have shallow hip roofs. The front façade is spanned by an elaborate porch.

The tall, rectangular windows are topped with limestone hoods decorated with an incised boss. False gables rise above the roofline on both street façades, each of which is pierced with an oculus window admitting light into the attic. The cornice is highly detailed with dentils and brackets. In the corners and under the gables the brackets extend farther down onto the walls.

A one-story frame structure once protruded from the side of the rear section, but has been removed. A kitchen porch and much of the ironwork were reconstructed in the 20th century based on an 1884 engraving of the house. Iron crests on the roof and porch were salvaged from an old hospital building in Menomonie, Wisconsin, and the fence was saved from a local cemetery. A detached garage at the rear of the lot is a modern addition and not considered a historic asset.

== History ==
Lorenz Ginthner (who also anglicized his name as "Lawrence") emigrated from Baden, Germany, in 1852 and settled in Wabasha three years later. He went into business as a tailor and merchant, manufacturing clothing on site and selling apparel shipped in by rail. In 1867 he had his own commercial building constructed in downtown Wabasha in 1867. His business continued to grow, requiring two additional tailors by the time he had the Ginther House built in 1882.

The house is an example of some 20 surviving 19th-century brick residences in Wabasha. All were built by the first two generations of the city's merchant class, forming a distinctive architectural theme that contrasts with the elaborate wood-frame Victorian architecture that characterized most other Minnesota communities. The choice of building material seems to have been a matter of local taste rather than accessibility, as Wabasha was not a major brick manufacturer compared to Lake City and Red Wing, upriver.

== See also ==
- National Register of Historic Places listings in Wabasha County, Minnesota
