= Wabasha County Poor House =

- U.S. National Register of Historic Places
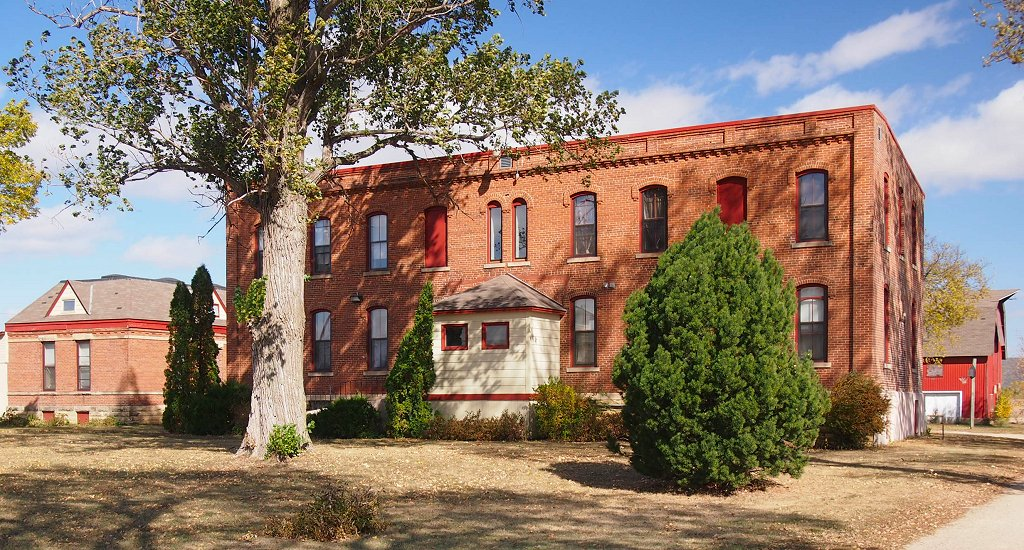
- The Wabasha County Poor House from the southwest

- Location within Minnesota Location within the United States
- Location: Hiawatha Drive, Wabasha, Minnesota
- Coordinates: 44°21′55″N 92°0′57″W
- Area: 5 acres (2.0 ha)
- Built: 1879, 1883
- Architect: E. Alexander and William B. Lutz
- NRHP reference No.: 82003064
- Designated: August 26, 1982

The Wabasha County Poor House is a historic poorhouse complex in Wabasha, Minnesota, United States, which was operated by Wabasha County from 1873 to the 1930s. The complex consists of an 1879 hospital, an 1883 residence hall, a barn, and a shed. The property was listed on the National Register of Historic Places in 1982 for its local significance in the theme of social history. It was nominated as a well-preserved example of the county-run poorhouses established in rural Minnesota in the latter 19th century, a reminder of early governmental efforts to aid the poor and aged before the advent of modern welfare programs.

== Description ==
The residence hall is a two-story, L-shaped, brick structure on a limestone foundation. The principal façade is 76 feet (23 m) long and the rear wing extends back 64 feet (20 m). Simple decoration along the cornice consists of a slightly corbelled parapet with recessed panels. A portico originally surmounted the main entrance, centrally placed on the main façade, but this was later replaced with an enclosed vestibule and a ramp.

Immediately north of the residence hall is the one-story brick hospital. It sits on a 20-by-30-foot (6 by 9 m) footprint. It has brick modillions decorating the eaveline and is topped by a truncated hip roof. A wooden lean-to addition extends to the north.

== History ==
In 1864 the Minnesota Legislature passed a law requiring each of the state's counties to provide a facility to care for their poor and aged residents. Wabasha County initially established its poor farm in 1867 on 160 acres (65 ha) in Hyde Park Township. However this quickly proved to be too isolated and large to manage efficiently, so the county secured 32 acres (13 ha) on the outskirts of Wabasha in 1873.

The main building on the property at that time was originally a barn that had been converted to a dance hall. Even though the owner had refitted the building at his own expense before selling it to the county for use as a poorhouse, it and the rest of the existing buildings were not adequate for their new use. These were gradually replaced with new, purpose-built structures, namely the hospital in 1879 and the residence hall in 1883. The latter building contained not only the residents' rooms but a kitchen, a dining room, and quarters for the superintendent.

Welfare largely remained the responsibility of county governments and social organizations until the Great Depression of the 1930s, when federal Social Security was introduced. Citizens in local government facilities were not fully eligible for the new benefits, however, so many residents moved out of the poorhouse network. Wabasha County responded by privatizing the poorhouse, leasing it out as a for-profit rest home so residents could remain and collect federal benefits.

The facility closed as a rest home in 1952. It stood vacant for four years, but from 1956 into the 1980s the main building housed a restaurant and residence. The property remains one of the few intact examples of the 64 poorhouse facilities established in Minnesota from 1854 to 1926.

== See also ==
- National Register of Historic Places listings in Wabasha County, Minnesota
