= Wabasha Bridge =

Wabasha Bridge may refer to:

- Wabasha-Nelson Bridge, connecting Wabasha, Minnesota, and Nelson, Wisconsin
- Wabasha Street Bridge in St. Paul, Minnesota
