= Clara and Julius Schmidt House =

Historic house in Minnesota, United States

- U.S. National Register of Historic Places
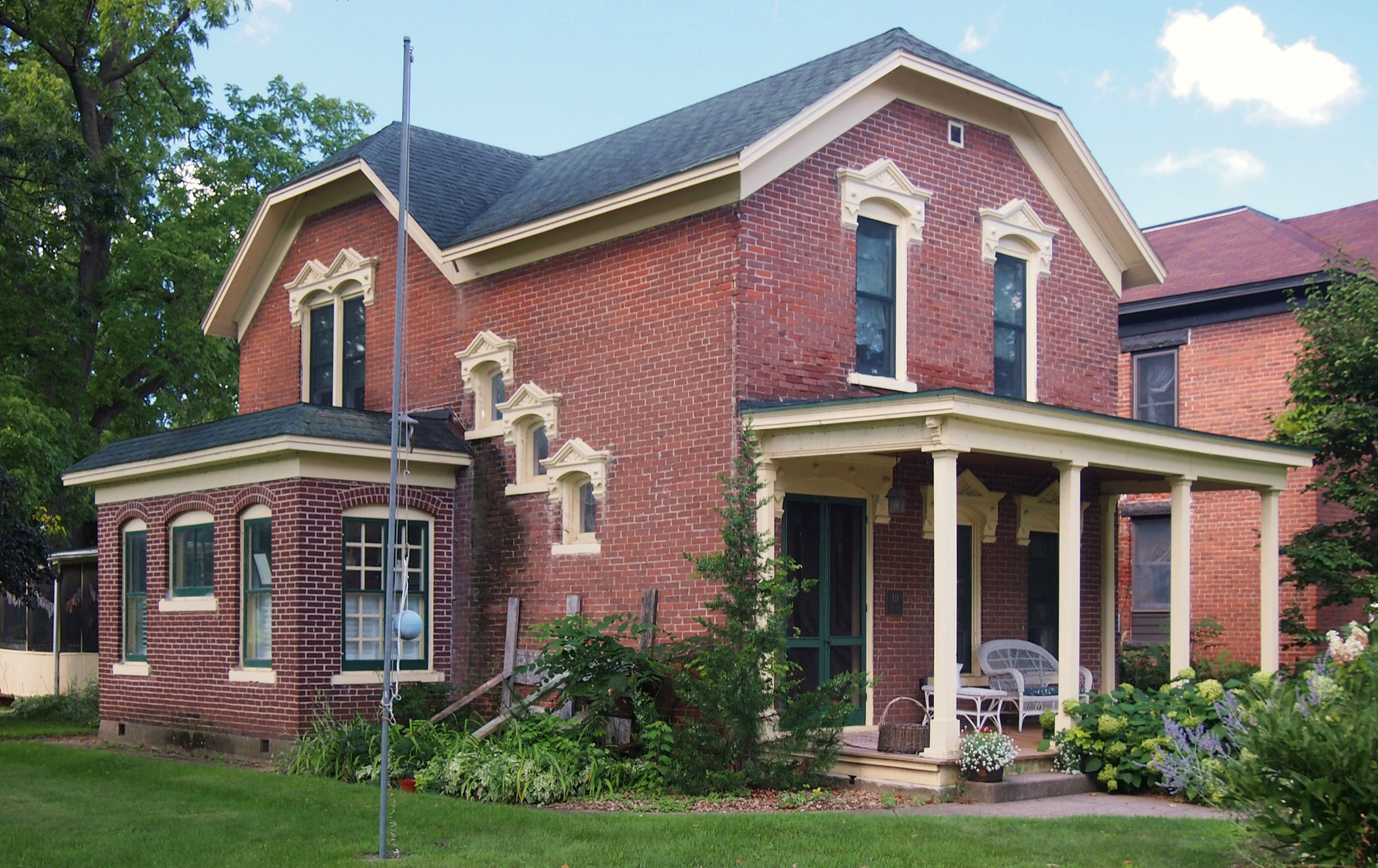
- The Clara and Julius Schmidt House from the east

- Location within Minnesota Location within the United States
- Location: 418 2nd Street East, Wabasha, Minnesota
- Coordinates: 44°22′49.8″N 92°1′43″W
- Area: Less than one acre
- Built: 1888
- Architectural style: Italianate
- MPS: Red Brick Houses in Wabasha, Minnesota, Associated with Merchant-Tradesmen MPS
- NRHP reference No.: 89000370
- Designated: May 15, 1989

The Clara and Julius Schmidt House is a historic house in Wabasha, Minnesota, United States. It was built in 1888 in the Italianate style and features architectural details rendered in tin. The house was listed on the National Register of Historic Places in 1989 for its local significance in the theme of architecture. It was nominated for being a prominent example of the brick homes constructed by Wabasha's late-19th-century merchant class, one made particularly distinctive by its tinwork.

== Description ==
The Schmidt House is a wood frame building with a brick veneer. The main section rises one and a half stories and is topped with a jerkinhead roof. A one-story kitchen wing at the rear gives the house an L-shaped footprint. A one-story sunroom was added to the side of the house in the early 20th century.

The house stands out for its tin window hoods, shaped as winged pediments resting on protruding bosses. Most distinctive is an ascending trio of small windows, which mark an internal staircase.

== History ==
Julius Schmidt was born in 1857 to a German American family in Milwaukee, and came to Wabasha as a child in 1864. He apprenticed to a tin maker, but went into business in 1882 as a partner in a hardware store. When he had this house built in 1888, he embraced the use of tinwork as a middle-class version of the architectural details that a wealthy homeowner would have rendered in stone. The tinwork was likely produced by Schmidt's foreman Herman Dieterle, who had built a regional reputation as a master craftsman and metalworker since 1862.

Schmidt became the sole owner of the hardware business in 1893 and ultimately served as president of the Minnesota Hardware Retailers Association. After his death, his widow Clara Schmidt donated to the city the open lot east of the house, which became known as Schmidt Park.

The Schmidt House is the last Italianate example of some 20 brick residences surviving from the 19th century in Wabasha. All were built by the first two generations of the city's merchant class, forming a distinctive architectural stock that contrasts with the elaborate wood-frame Victorian architecture that characterized most other communities in Minnesota. As time went on the choice of building material appears to have been a matter of local taste rather than accessibility, as Wabasha was not a major brick manufacturer compared to Lake City and Red Wing upriver.

== See also ==
- National Register of Historic Places listings in Wabasha County, Minnesota
