= Henry S. and Magdalena Schwedes House =

Historic house in Minnesota, United States

- U.S. National Register of Historic Places
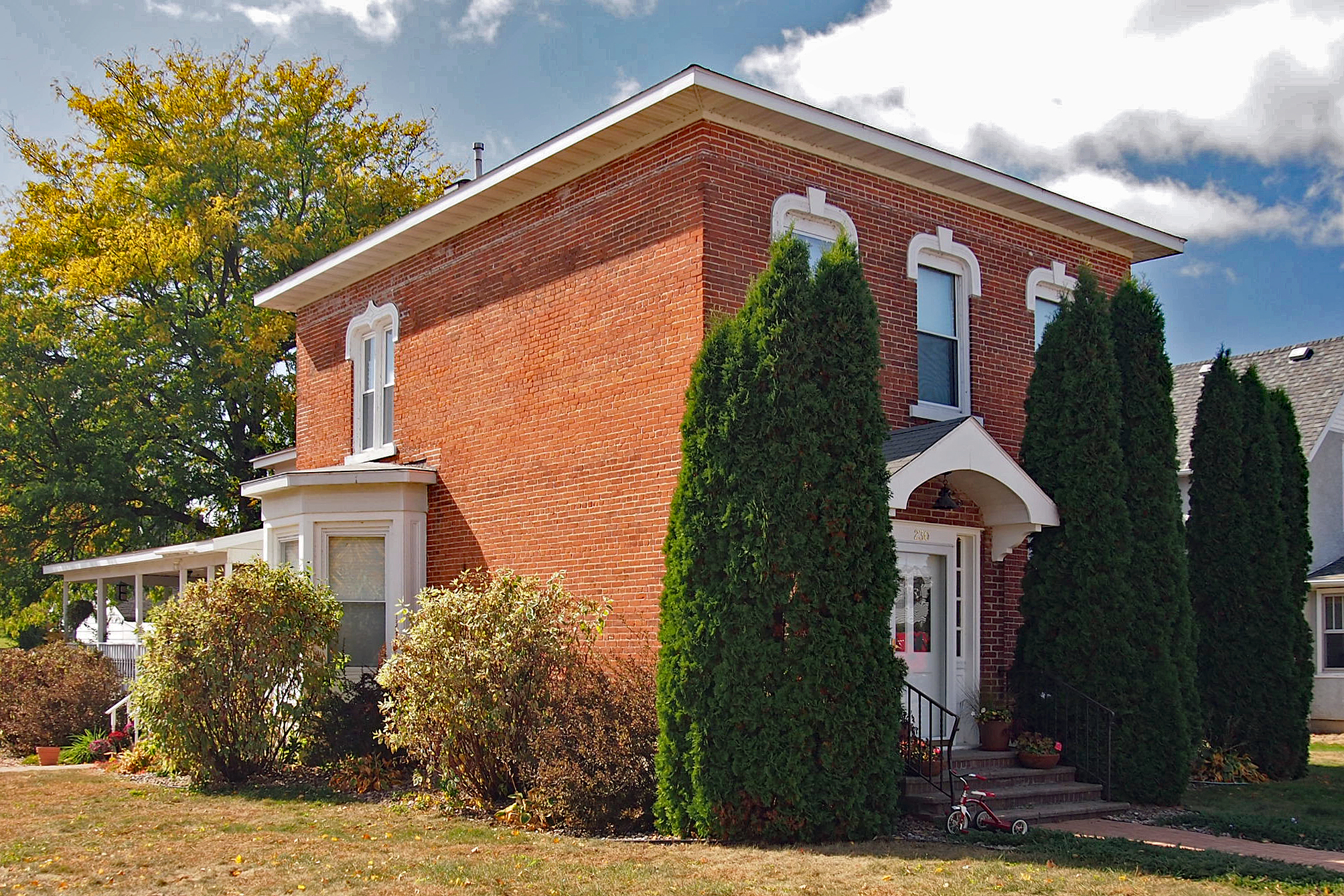
- The Henry S. and Magdalena Schwedes House from the northeast

- Location within Minnesota Location within the United States
- Location: 230 E. Main Street, Wabasha, Minnesota
- Coordinates: 44°22′56″N 92°1′47″W
- Area: Less than one acre
- Built: 1882
- Architectural style: Italianate
- MPS: Red Brick Houses in Wabasha, Minnesota, Associated with Merchant-Tradesmen MPS
- NRHP reference No.: 89000371
- Designated: May 15, 1989

The Henry S. and Magdalena Schwedes House is a historic house in Wabasha, Minnesota, United States. It was built in 1882, part of a unique trend among the city's merchant class for brick houses. It was listed on the National Register of Historic Places in 1989 for its local significance in the theme of architecture. It was nominated for typifying Italianate architecture in its peak year of popularity in Wabasha, and for inaugurating a second generation of the town's merchants living in brick homes.

== Description ==
The Schwedes House is a brick building originally consisting of a cubical two-story front section and a one-and-a-half-story section at the rear. A remodeling around 1910 added a one-story wing to the back of the house and a bay window to the southeast corner of the main section. The house exhibits classic elements of Italianate architecture in its cubic massing, the shallow hip roofs of each section, the widely overhanging eaves, and the tall windows with hood molds. The circa-1910 additions maintained the style of the original sections, even matching the distinctive window hoods. The ornamental brackets that once decorated the eaves have been removed since the house's National Register nomination.

The front door is set into a projecting brick entry with a gable roof. The south corner of the house has a wraparound veranda off the kitchen. At the rear of the lot is a 20th-century detached garage, which is considered noncontributory to the historic listing.

== History ==
Henry S. Schwedes was born in Wisconsin to German immigrant parents. In 1882 he married the daughter of Lucas Kuehn, Wabasha's leading merchant, and joined Kuehn's business as a bookkeeper, the profession in which he'd trained. Kuehn had this house built for the newlyweds next door to his own residence. Henry Schwedes soon achieved the role of secretary-treasurer in his father-in-law's prosperous company, and ultimately rose to general manager.

The Schwedes House is among the more intact examples of some 20 brick residences surviving from the 19th century in Wabasha. All were built by the first two generations of the city's merchant class, forming a distinctive architectural stock that contrasts with the elaborate wood-frame Victorian architecture that characterized most other communities in Minnesota. As time went on the choice of building material appears to have been a matter of local taste rather than accessibility, as Wabasha was not a major brick manufacturer compared to Lake City and Red Wing upriver.

== See also ==
- National Register of Historic Places listings in Wabasha County, Minnesota
