= Lucas Kuehn House =

Historic house in Minnesota, United States

- U.S. National Register of Historic Places
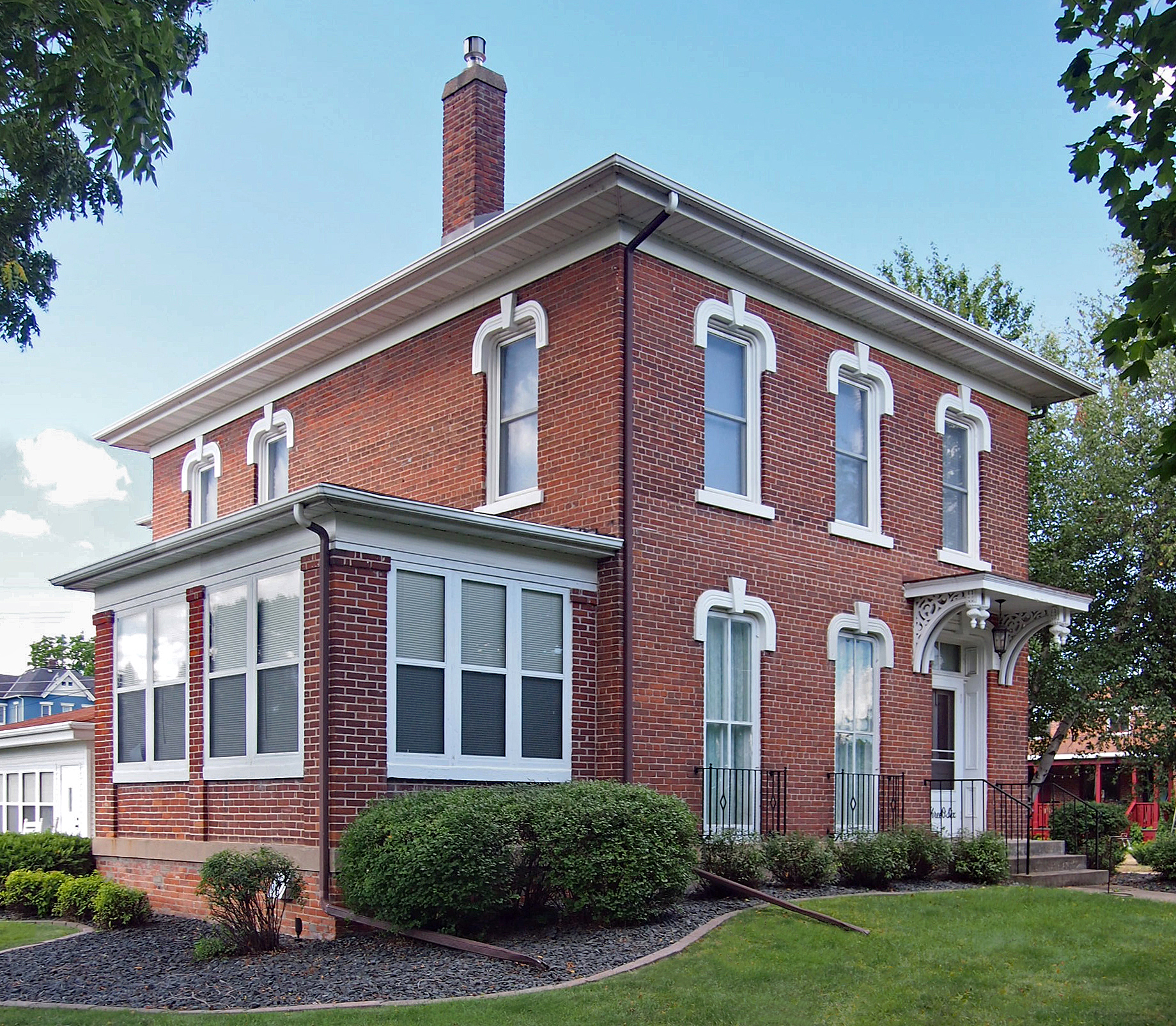
- The Lucas Kuehn House from the northeast

- Location within Minnesota Location within the United States
- Location: 306 East Main Street, Wabasha, Minnesota
- Coordinates: 44°22′55.5″N 92°1′45.5″W
- Area: Less than one acre
- Built: 1878
- Architectural style: Italianate
- MPS: Red Brick Houses in Wabasha, Minnesota, Associated with Merchant-Tradesmen MPS
- NRHP reference No.: 89000369
- Designated: July 29, 1994

The Lucas Kuehn House is a historic house in Wabasha, Minnesota, United States. It was built in 1878 for Lucas Kuehn (1834–?), the city's leading merchant of the 19th century. The house was the city's first to be designed in the Italianate style. It was also part of a unique trend among Wabasha's merchant class for houses constructed of brick. It was listed on the National Register of Historic Places in 1994 for its local significance in the themes of architecture and commerce. It was nominated for its associations with Kuehn and for its exemplary Italianate architecture.

== Description ==
The Lucas Kuehn House is a two-story brick building with two main sections slightly offset from each other. A large back porch, now enclosed, fills the rear angle between the sections. In the 1920s a one-story wing extending from the rear of the house was replaced with an attached garage, while a one-story sunroom was added to the side of the front section. Both additions were matched to the style of the original sections. The front of the house once had a full-width veranda. This has been replaced with a small canopy over the main entrance, though it sports an elaborate pair of brackets. The original sections' windows are topped with wooden hoods with exaggerated limestone keystones.

The wide eaves are characteristic of Italianate architecture, though they lack the bracketing common to the style. Other solidly Italianate elements include the boxy two-story massing and tall, narrow windows.

== History ==
Lucas Kuehn was born in the Grand Duchy of Baden in 1834 and emigrated to the United States with his family when he was 18. The Kuehns settled in Ohio for three years, where they worked as miners. Lucas showed such leadership talent that he was promoted to foreman over a crew that included his own father and brothers. In 1855 the family decided to move to Saint Paul, Minnesota. While journeying up the Mississippi River by steamboat from Dubuque, Iowa, however, they heard discouraging news about the availability of housing there and instead disembarked at Reads Landing, Minnesota. Lucas immediately found employment working the river and parted from his family.

In 1858 Kuehn settled in Wabasha. Later that year he married Clara Guenthner, a fellow native of Baden whom he'd met when they were children. In 1862 he opened a bakery, but two years later he changed direction and entered the dry goods and grocery business. In this he prospered, commissioning his own building in downtown Wabasha in 1868 and expanding it threefold into the city's largest store six years later. This building still stands as a contributing property to the Wabasha Commercial Historic District.

Kuehn's business expansion was propelled by the railroad, which had reached Wabasha in 1871. He owned 640 acres (260 ha) across the river in Buffalo County, Wisconsin, which he logged to provide the Chicago, Milwaukee, St. Paul and Pacific Railroad with railroad ties.

In 1878, Kuehn had this house built, introducing Italianate architecture to Wabasha's housing stock. Within a few years he also commissioned two other brick Italianate houses nearby for his newlywed daughters, including the Henry S. and Magdalena Schwedes House next door.

Henry Schwedes, Kuehn's son-in-law, became his right-hand-man in the grocery business. Kuehn also branched out, opening a hotel in the early 1880s since Wabasha lacked any first-class accommodations. He was elected president of a local bank, but resigned after two years because he was so busy with other interests.

Lucas and Clara Kuehn had eight children, though one died in childhood. Clara died in 1917, leaving Lucas widowed after 58 years. The only source giving a death date for Lucas Kuehn claims 1943, which would be an implausible 107-year lifespan.

The Kuehn House is among the more intact examples of some 20 brick residences surviving from the 19th century in Wabasha. All were built by the first two generations of the city's merchant class, forming a distinctive architectural stock that contrasts with the elaborate wood-frame Victorian architecture that characterized most other communities in Minnesota. As time went on the choice of building material appears to have been a matter of local taste rather than accessibility, as Wabasha was not a major brick manufacturer compared to Lake City and Red Wing upriver. With this house and the two he built for his daughters, Kuehn steered the later years of this trend firmly toward the Italianate style.

== See also ==
- National Register of Historic Places listings in Wabasha County, Minnesota
