= Alexander Thoirs House =

Historic house in Minnesota, United States

- U.S. National Register of Historic Places
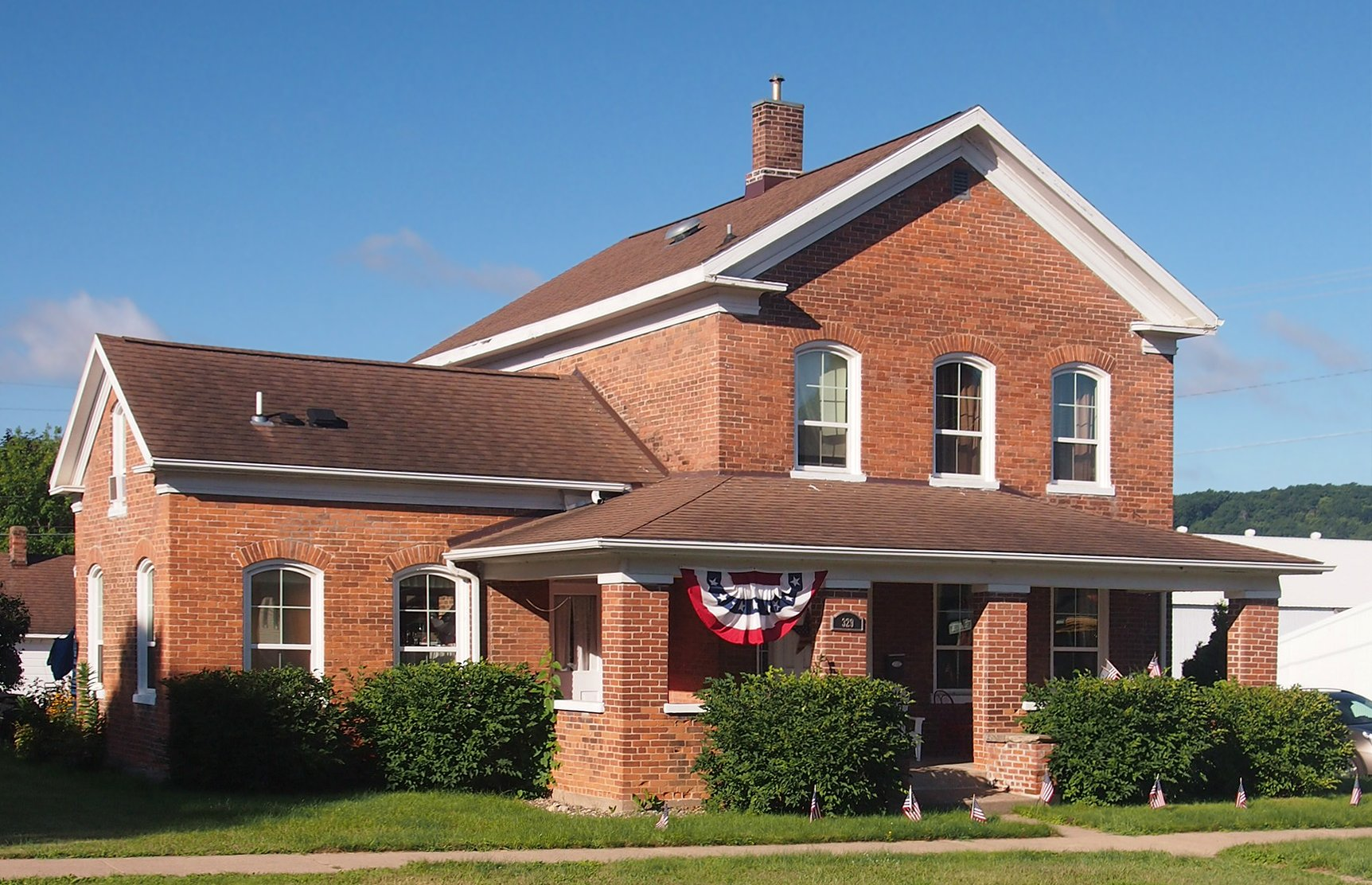
- The Alexander Thoirs House from the northeast

- Location within Minnesota Location within the United States
- Location: 329 West 2nd Street, Wabasha, Minnesota
- Coordinates: 44°23′2″N 92°2′9″W
- Area: Less than one acre
- Built: 1868–1870
- Architectural style: Greek Revival
- MPS: Red Brick Houses in Wabasha, Minnesota, Associated with Merchant-Tradesmen MPS
- NRHP reference No.: 89000372
- Designated: May 15, 1989

The Alexander Thoirs House is the oldest surviving brick house in Wabasha, Minnesota, United States, and the earliest example of the brick merchant houses that characterized the city's 19th-century streetscape. It was built in two phases in 1868 and 1870 for a successful local shoemaker. The house was listed on the National Register of Historic Places in 1989 for having local significance in the theme of architecture. It was nominated for its status in the city's early housing stock, its fine Greek Revival architecture, and its embodiment of the success of Wabasha's early merchant class, which helped establish the city's own commercial importance.

== Description ==
The Alexander Thoirs House is a wood frame building with a brick veneer. The main section is a two-story rectangle, with a 1 1/2-story wing centered on one side, giving the house a T-shaped footprint. The foundation is cement-plastered limestone. A porch spans the front of the main wing and wraps around to attach to the side wing. The house sits prominently on a corner lot facing northeast.

The house is unornamented aside from the distinctive gable returns of Greek Revival architecture. Other elements of the style include the low gables, sidehall plan, and general proportions. The brick veneer and arched windows, however, are quite atypical of Greek Revival.

== History ==
Alexander Thoirs was a Scottish immigrant who had this home built for himself in 1868 shortly after arriving in Wabasha. Two years later he had additional work done on the house, which was likely when the T-wing was added. He established himself as a shoe- and bootmaker, one of the merchants who helped position Wabasha as a commercial center for finished goods in the region even before the arrival of railroad access. The unusual use of brick veneer—and the lower quality of the brick, which is fairly soft—suggest the underdeveloped construction and manufacturing industries of the time, and the lack of transportation infrastructure to deliver more refined materials and methods.

The front porch was added in the 1920s. At an unknown date, an enclosed wooded porch replaced an open porch in the south corner and a canopy was added to the rear of the house to serve as a basic carport.

The Thoirs House is the oldest of some 20 brick residences surviving from the 19th century in Wabasha. All were built by the first two generations of the city's merchant class, forming a distinctive architectural stock that contrasts with the elaborate wood-frame Victorian architecture that characterized most other communities in Minnesota. As time went on the choice of building material appears to have been a matter of local taste rather than accessibility, as Wabasha was not a major manufacturer of brick compared to Lake City and Red Wing upriver.

== See also ==
- National Register of Historic Places listings in Wabasha County, Minnesota
