= Historic Anderson House Hotel =

- Hurd House–Anderson Hotel
- U.S. National Register of Historic Places
- U.S. Historic district – Contributing property
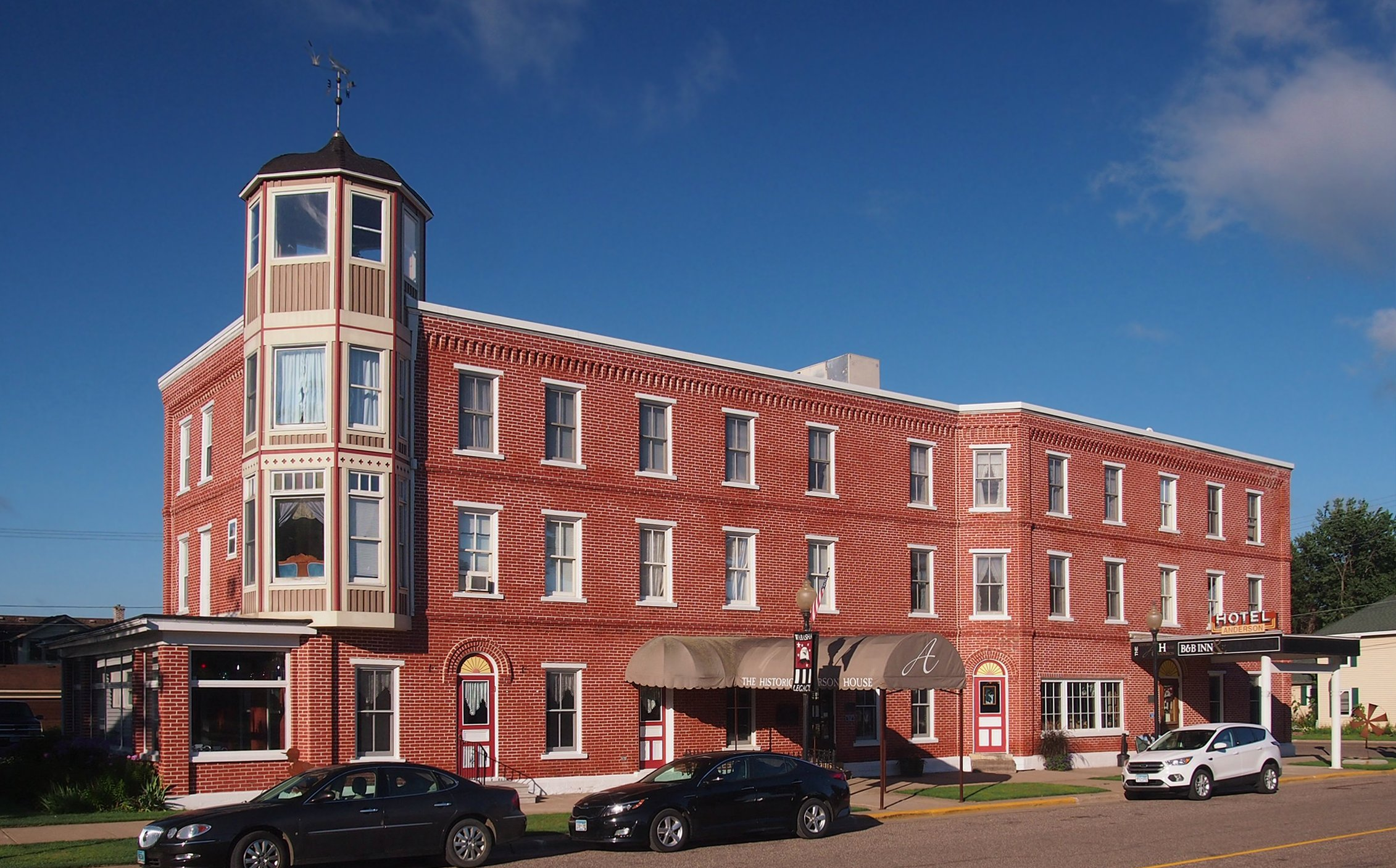
- The Historic Anderson House Hotel from the northeast

- Location within Minnesota Location within the United States
- Location: 333 West Main Street, Wabasha, Minnesota
- Coordinates: 44°23′5.5″N 92°2′6″W
- Area: 1 acre (0.40 ha)
- Built: 1856, expanded 1887
- Built by: B.S. Hurd, Ziba C. Goss
- Part of: Wabasha Commercial Historic District (ID82003063)
- NRHP reference No.: 78001566

Significant dates
- Added to NRHP: September 18, 1978
- Designated CP: April 15, 1982

The Historic Anderson House Hotel is a hotel and event venue in Wabasha, Minnesota, United States. The hotel opened in 1856 and was Minnesota's oldest continuously operating bed and breakfast inn west of the Mississippi River. Most of the furniture dates back to 1856 as well. The building was expanded in 1887. It was listed on the National Register of Historic Places as the Hurd House–Anderson Hotel in 1978 for having local significance in the theme of commerce. It was nominated for being a prominent and long-operating business originating in the years of Wabasha's rapid growth as a river and rail transportation hub. In 1982 it was also listed as a contributing property to the Wabasha Commercial Historic District.

== History ==
The hotel was built by B.F. Hurd in 1856 and was known as the Hurd House until 1909. Hurd's son-in-law became owner of the hotel in 1885 and added a third story and a west wing. He also installed electricity and modern bathrooms. In 1909 the Anderson family purchased the business and renamed it the Anderson Hotel.

The hotel was known for the Dutch cooking in the restaurant; a 1948 Anderson family cookbook had 500 recipes. It was also famous for the cats which hotel guests could stay with for overnight companionship. A 1990 children's book, Blumpoe the Grumpoe Meets Arnold the Cat, told the story of a curmudgeon who traveled to Wabasha and was endeared to the black-and-white cat that slept in his room.

The hotel closed for business on March 19, 2009, as a result of the economic downturn. Owners Teresa and Mike Smith had been trying to sell the inn for three years, but were unsuccessful. They had been subsidizing the inn with their retirement savings but eventually had to declare bankruptcy.

In 2011 the hotel was purchased by the Yenters and was remodeled. The hotel reopened a few months later, replacing the restaurant with a museum and ending the tradition of cats in rooms.

== See also ==
- National Register of Historic Places listings in Wabasha County, Minnesota
