= Joyce M. Lund =

American journalist and politician (1909–2009)

Joyce Lund

Member of the Minnesota House of Representatives from the 3 district
- In office January 4th, 1955 – January 7th, 1957
- Preceded by: Furst, Frank
- Succeeded by: Furst, Frank

Joyce M. Lund (née Ireton) (March 23, 1909 – July 20, 2009) was an American journalist and politician.

Born in Minneapolis, Minnesota, Lund graduated from West High School in Minneapolis. She graduated from the University of Minnesota in 1931 with a bachelor's degree in journalism. In 1932, Lund moved to Wabasha, Minnesota. She was an editor and writer for the Wabasha County Herald. She also wrote for the Rochester Post-Bulletin and for the Associated Press. Lund served in the Minnesota House of Representatives in 1955 and 1956 and was a Democrat. Lund died at a hospital in Wabasha, Minnesota.
