= Swedish Evangelical Lutheran Church (Millville, Minnesota) =

Historic church in Minnesota, United States

- U.S. National Register of Historic Places
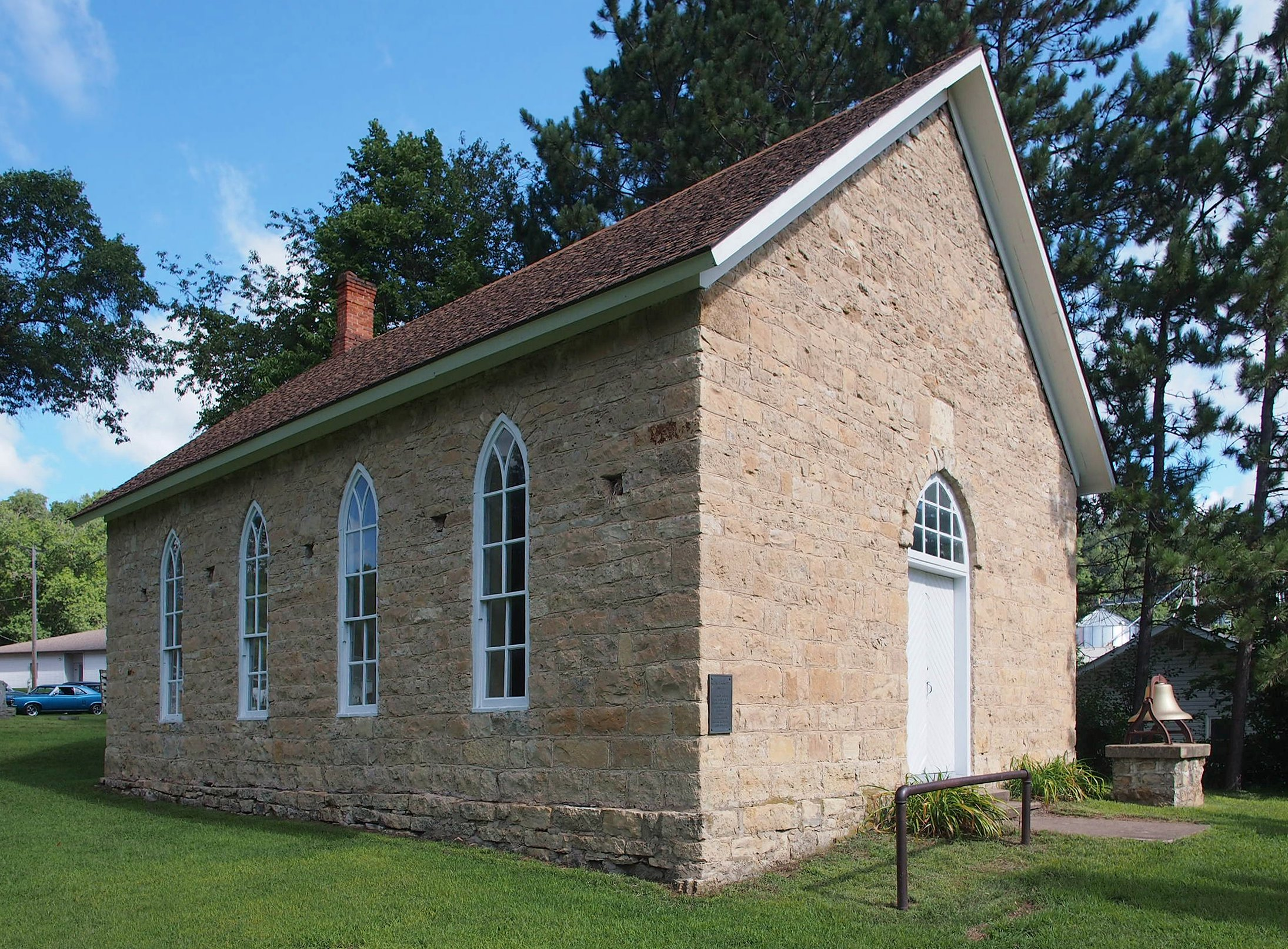
- The Swedish Evangelical Lutheran Church from the south

- Location within Minnesota Location within the United States
- Location: Bridge Street, Millville, Minnesota
- Coordinates: 44°14′37.3″N 92°17′48″W
- Area: Less than one acre
- Built: 1874
- Architectural style: Gothic Revival
- NRHP reference No.: 88003086
- Designated: January 19, 1989

The Swedish Evangelical Lutheran Church is a historic church building in Millville, Minnesota, United States. It was built in 1874 and used successively by Swedish, Norwegian, and German immigrant congregations. The church and its adjacent cemetery were listed on the National Register of Historic Places in 1989 for having local significance in the theme of European ethnic heritage. It was nominated for being the only intact surviving ethnic church from the peak of European immigration to Wabasha County.

== History ==
The congregation was organized in 1869 by Swedish immigrant settlers in the area, but the community could not afford to build a church until 1874. When they had the money, they acquired the minimal materials, such as lumber and stone. They quarried buff-colored Oneota limestone from the land of one of the members. Interior furnishings such as the pews and pulpit were handmade. The total cost of materials was $802.60. After the church was built it continued to have a difficult history, as many of its families moved to the west. Many of the Swedish immigrants were replaced by Norwegian-American families, who used the church until 1914. In 1905 Grace German Evangelical Church began holding services there. It was used by other groups until 1967, and then it was abandoned until the Millville Historical Association purchased the building in the late 1970s.

== See also ==
- List of Lutheran churches
- National Register of Historic Places listings in Wabasha County, Minnesota
