= Grace Memorial Episcopal Church (Wabasha, Minnesota) =

Historic church in Minnesota, United States

- U.S. National Register of Historic Places
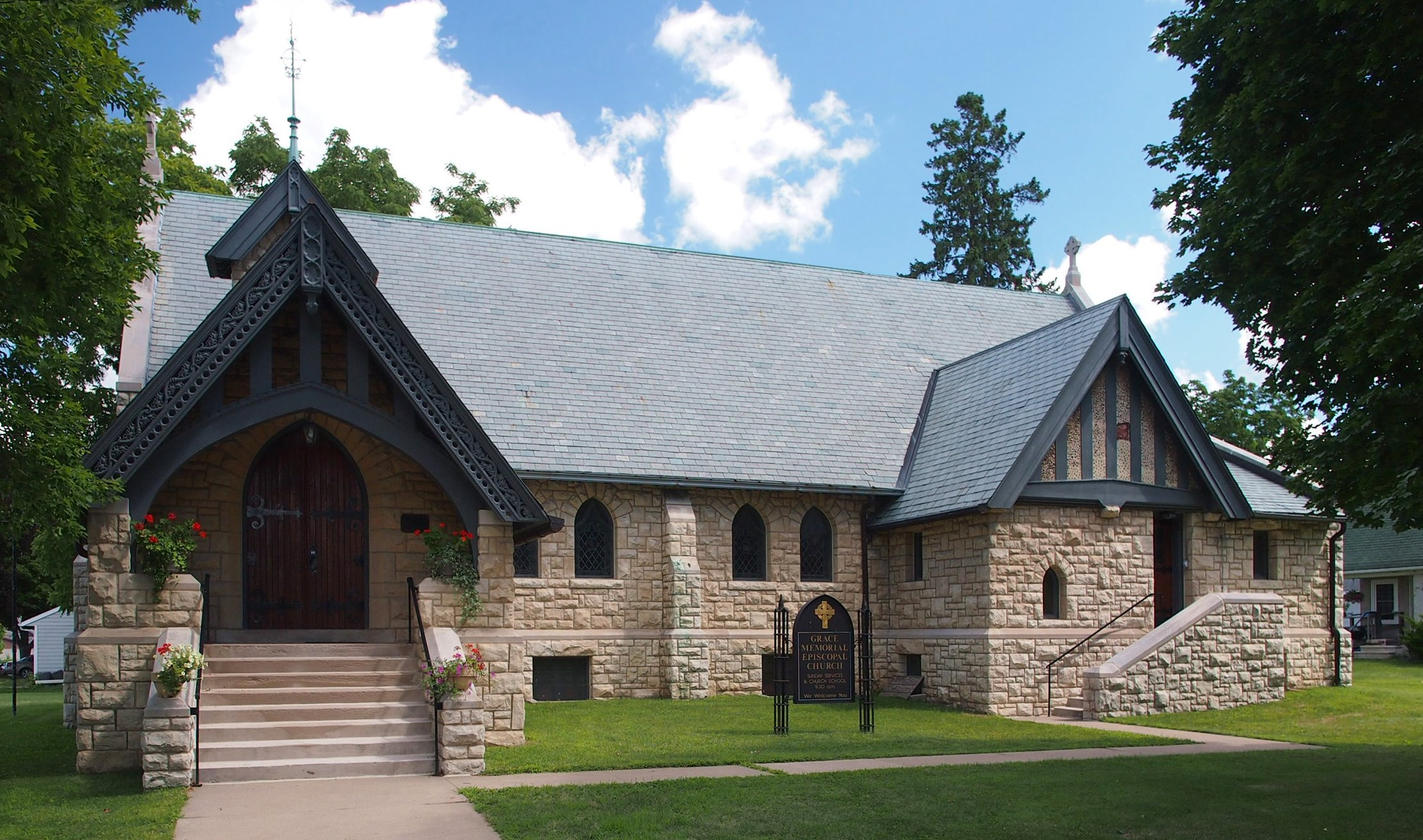
- The Grace Memorial Episcopal Church from the southwest

- Location within Minnesota Location within the United States
- Location: 205 East 3rd Street, Wabasha, Minnesota
- Coordinates: 44°22′52.5″N 92°1′53.5″W
- Area: Less than one acre
- Built: 1900
- Built by: Cass Gilbert
- Architectural style: English Gothic Revival
- NRHP reference No.: 82003062
- Designated: February 4, 1982

The Grace Memorial Episcopal Church is a historic church in Wabasha, Minnesota, United States, built in 1900. The building was listed on the National Register of Historic Places in 1982 for having local significance in the themes of architecture and religion. It was nominated for being "the most distinguished ecclesiastical structure" in Wabasha and "the work of prominent Minnesota architect Cass Gilbert". The church reported 119 members in 2020 and 29 members in 2023; no membership statistics were reported in 2024 parochial reports. Plate and pledge income reported for the congregation in 2024 was $14,628 with average Sunday attendance (ASA) of 13 persons.

== Description ==
Grace Memorial Episcopal Church is a one-story building on a modified cruciform plan. It was designed in the style of English Gothic architecture, with walls of random coursed stone. The main gable ends have stone coping topped by Celtic crosses at the peaks. The roof is of slate.

There are two projecting gables on the main façade that contain doors. The gable at the main entrance has a decorated bargeboard, a Gothic arch, and a belfry. The gable over the secondary entrance has half-timbering over cobblestone infill.

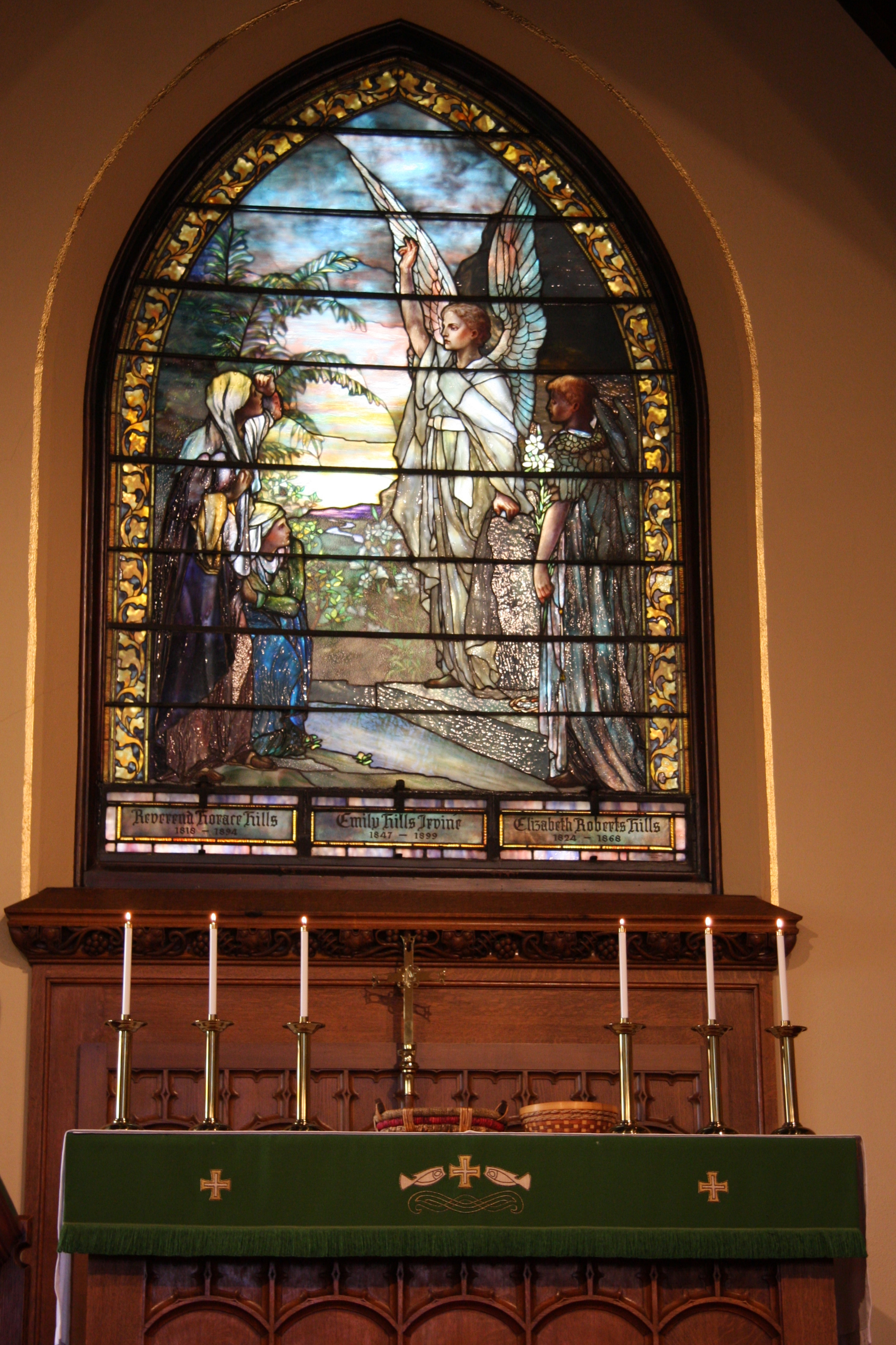
The altar and chancel window

The building is characterized by several stained glass windows in Gothic framing, flanked by stone buttresses. The largest such window is on the northwest wall, but the chancel window at the southeast, entitled "Three Marys at the Tomb", was designed by Tiffany Studios. It depicts the Virgin Mary, and Mary Magdalene at the tomb on Easter morning. The window cost $3000.

== History ==
This building was commissioned by Saint Paul-based lumberman Thomas Irvine to replace an existing church in Wabasha while serving as a memorial to his wife Emily Hills Irvine and her parents. Her father Horace Hills had been the priest of the original Grace Episcopal Church from 1872 to 1877.

== See also ==
- List of Anglican churches
- National Register of Historic Places listings in Wabasha County, Minnesota
