= James C. and Agnes M. Stout House =

Historic house in Minnesota, United States

- U.S. National Register of Historic Places
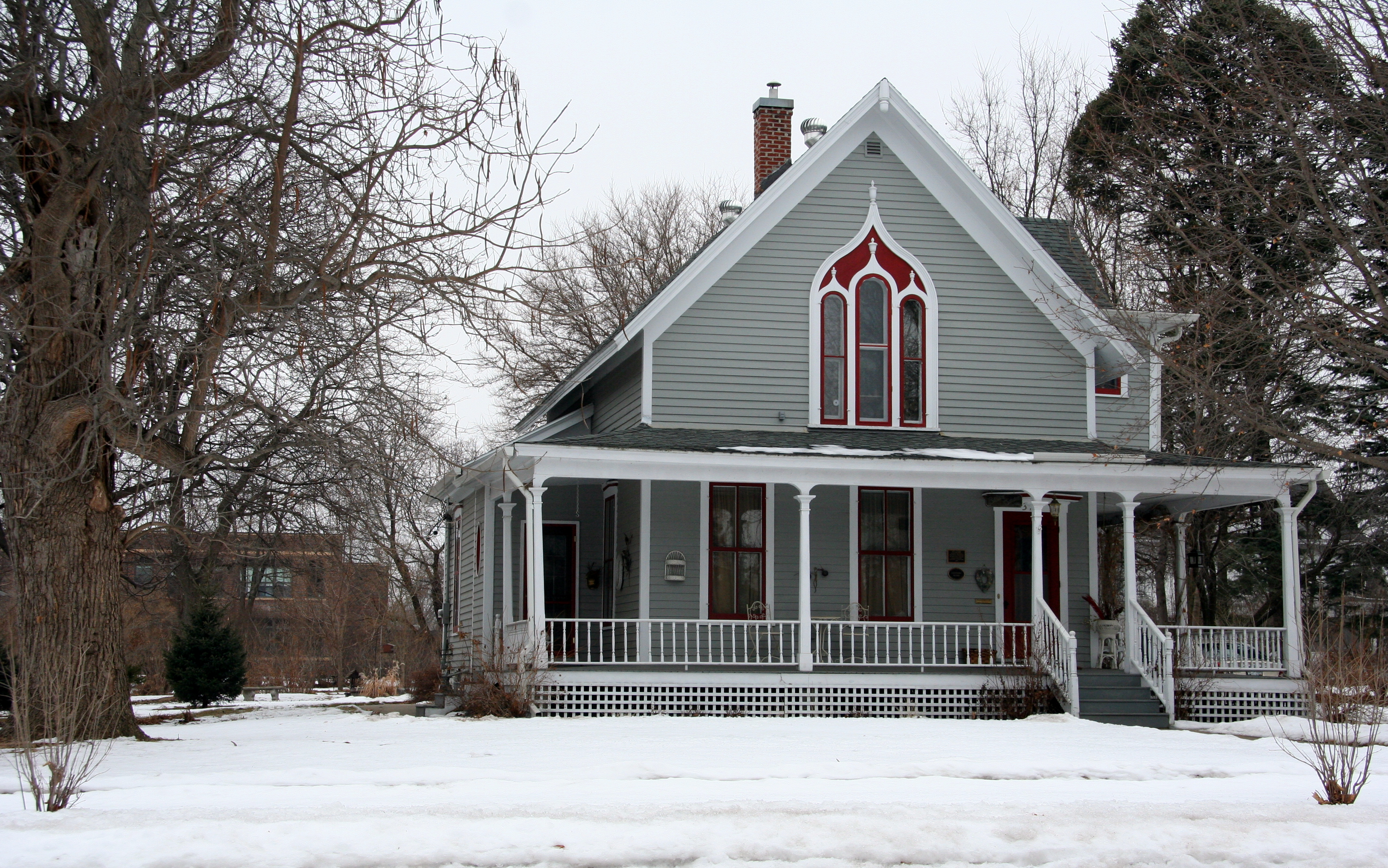
- The James C. and Agnes M. Stout House from the northeast

- Location within Minnesota Location within the United States
- Location: 310 S. Oak Street, Lake City, Minnesota
- Coordinates: 44°26′45.5″N 92°15′58″W
- Area: Less than one acre
- Built: 1872
- Built by: Tupper & Collins
- Architectural style: Carpenter Gothic
- NRHP reference No.: 88003138
- Designated: January 13, 1989

The James C. and Agnes M. Stout House is a historic house in Lake City, Minnesota, United States. It was built in 1872. The house was listed on the National Register of Historic Places in 1989 for its local significance in the theme of architecture. It was nominated for being a leading example of the Carpenter Gothic style, which is fairly rare among Minnesota's housing stock.

== See also ==
- National Register of Historic Places listings in Wabasha County, Minnesota
