= Wabasha Commercial Historic District =

Historic district in Minnesota, United States

- U.S. National Register of Historic Places
- U.S. Historic district
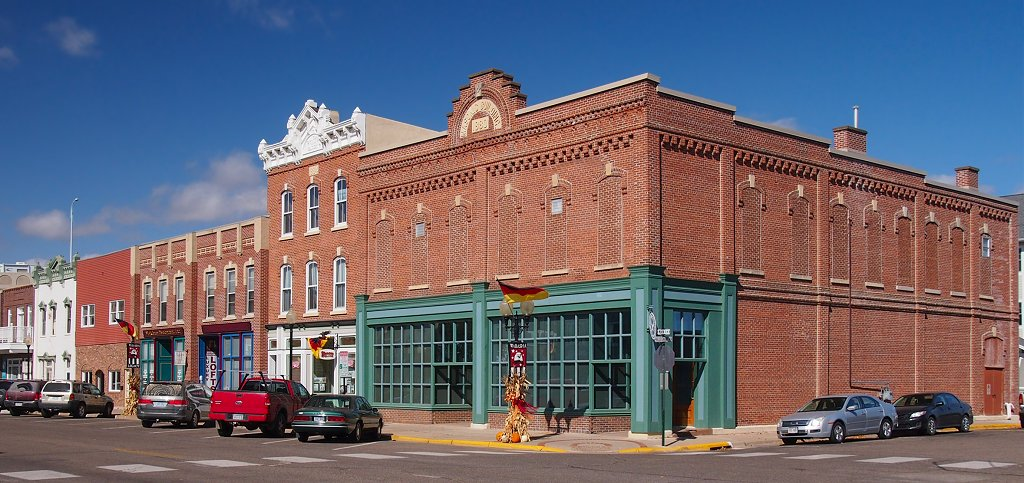
- Part of the Wabasha Commercial Historic District at the corner of Main Street and Allegheny Avenue

- Location within Minnesota Location within the United States
- Location: Roughly along Main Street between Bridge and Bailey Avenues, Wabasha, Minnesota
- Coordinates: 44°23′2″N 92°1′58″W
- Area: 10 acres (4.0 ha)
- Built: 1856–1928
- Architect: Multiple
- Architectural style: Italianate
- NRHP reference No.: 82003063
- Designated HD: April 15, 1982

The Wabasha Commercial Historic District is a designation applied to the historic downtown of Wabasha, Minnesota, United States. It comprises 52 contributing properties built from 1856 to 1928. It was listed as a historic district on the National Register of Historic Places in 1982 for having local significance in the theme of commerce. It was nominated for the integrity of its cohesive design and its continuity of use as a commercial district since the mid-19th century.

== Description ==
The Wabasha Commercial Historic District is situated on a fluvial terrace parallel to the Mississippi River. Encompassing about 10 acres (4.0 ha), it stretches three and a half blocks along Wabasha's Main Street to the width of one block on either side, with a slight extension to the southwest along Pembroke Avenue. Of the 59 buildings included in the district upon its designation in 1982, all but 15 dated to the latter half of the 19th century. The district primarily comprises commercial buildings, though the western end includes several residential houses.

The commercial buildings are largely consistent in design. Nearly all stand two stories tall, with brick walls or façades, and featuring a commercial adaptation of Italianate architecture. Their ornamentation is largely restrained to simple brick cornices, stone window sills and keystones, and a modest variety of window styles.

One contributing property, the Hurd House–Anderson Hotel, had been individually listed on the National Register in 1978. Eight buildings were considered non-contributing properties because they were constructed or significantly altered outside the period or style of the rest of the district.

== Gallery ==
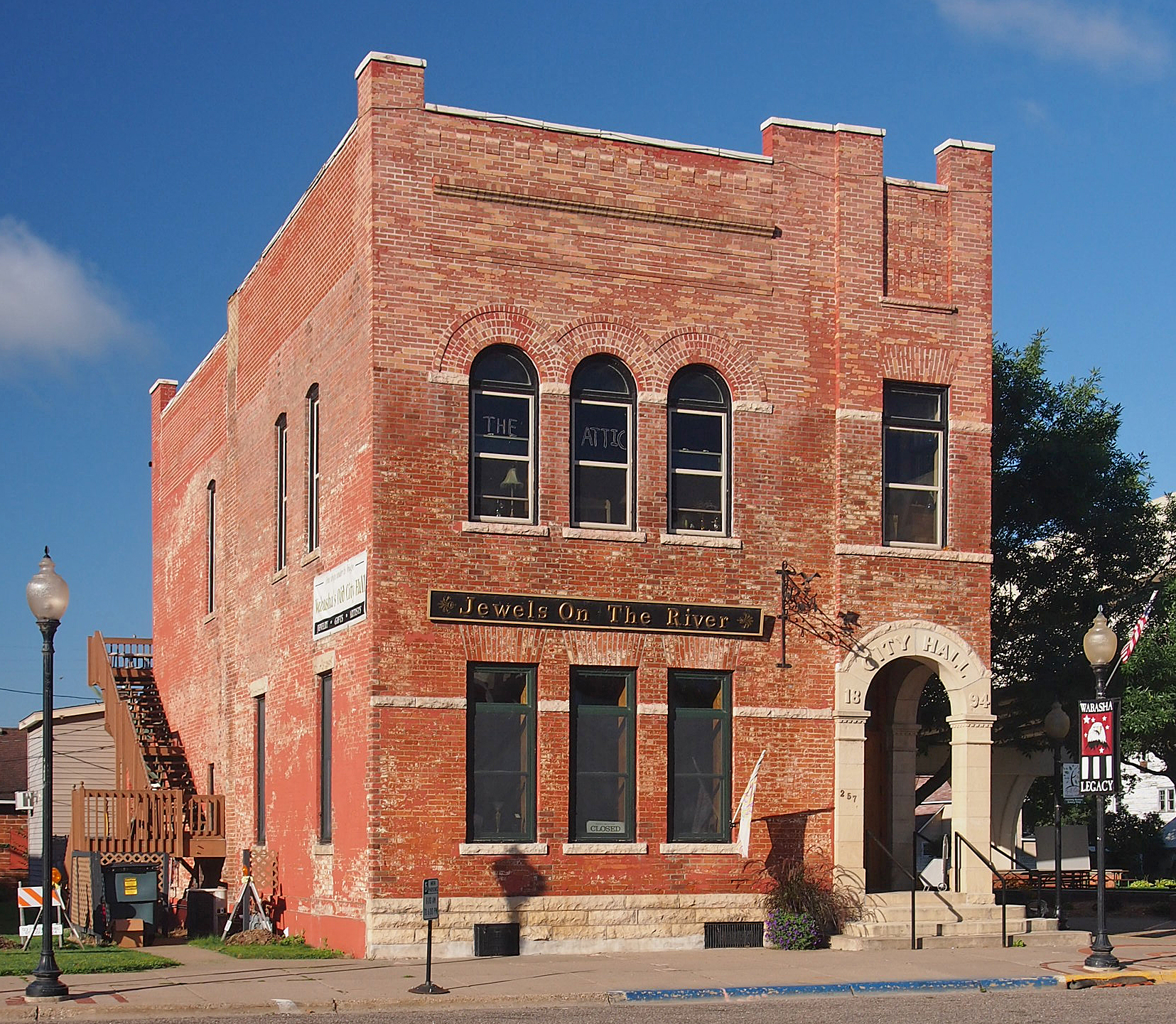
The former Wabasha City Hall (1894)

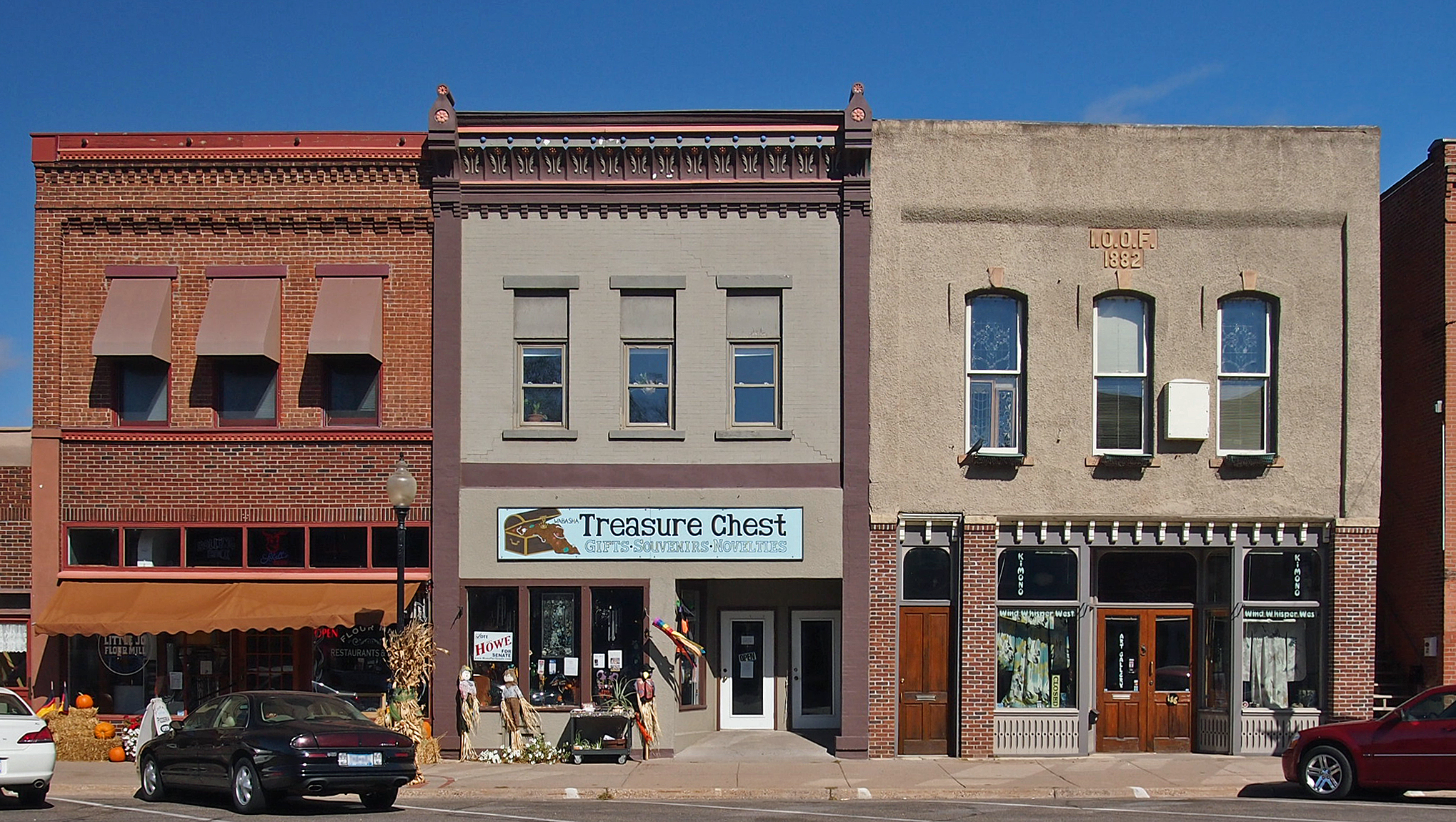
Three 1880s buildings

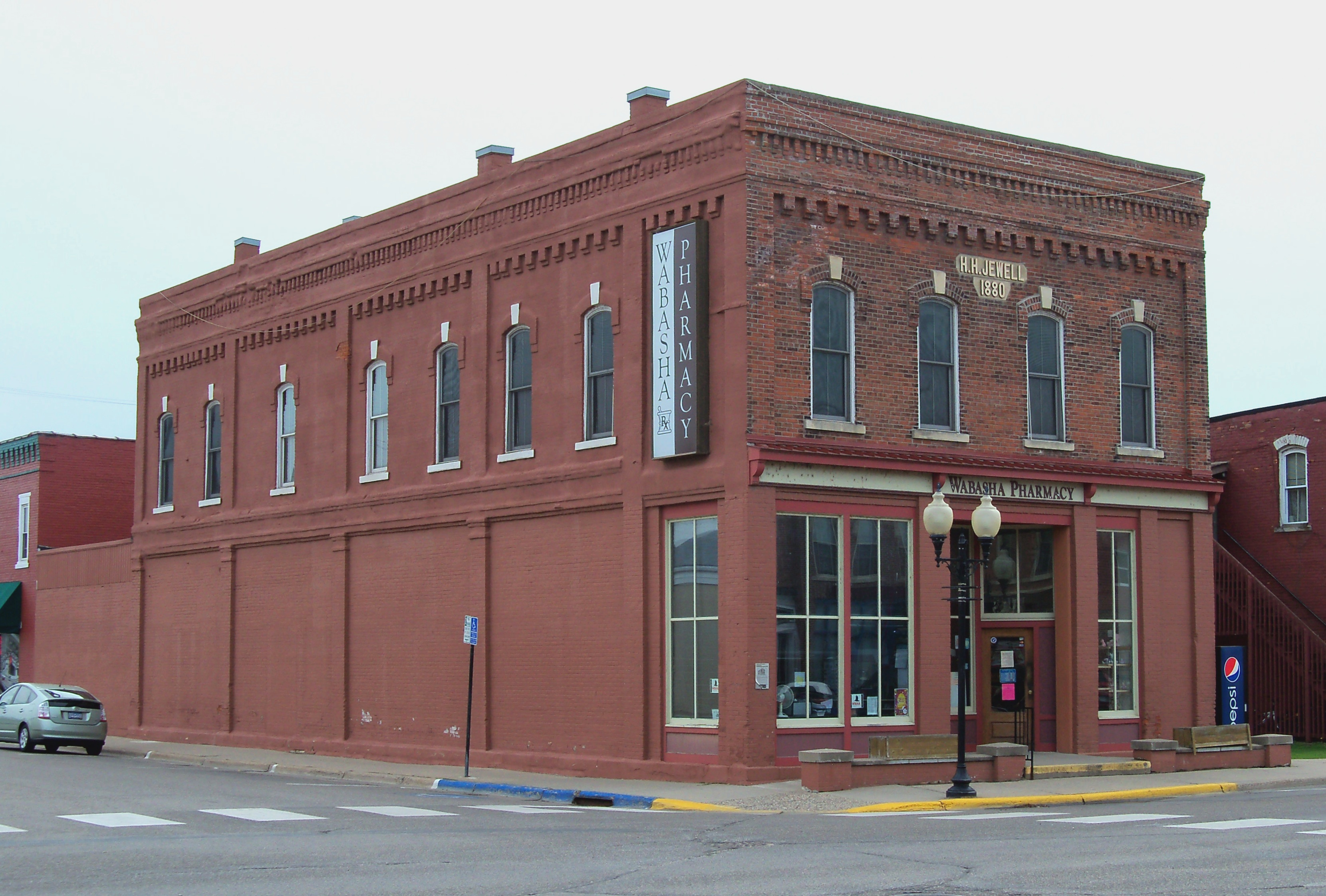
The H.H. Jewell Building (1880)

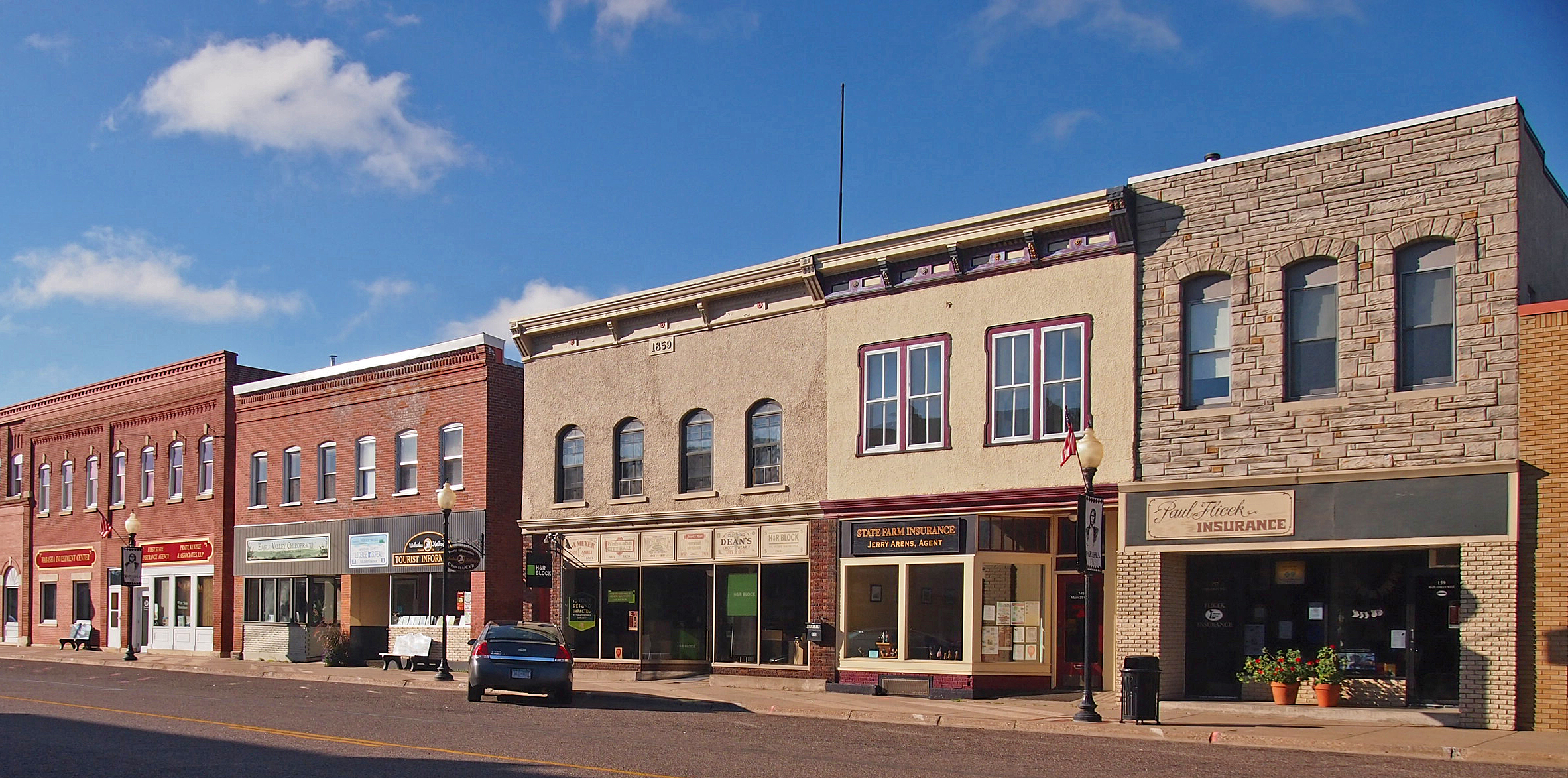
Row of buildings on the south side of Main Street

== See also ==
- National Register of Historic Places listings in Wabasha County, Minnesota
