= August Kuehn House =

Historic house in Indiana, United States

- U.S. National Register of Historic Places
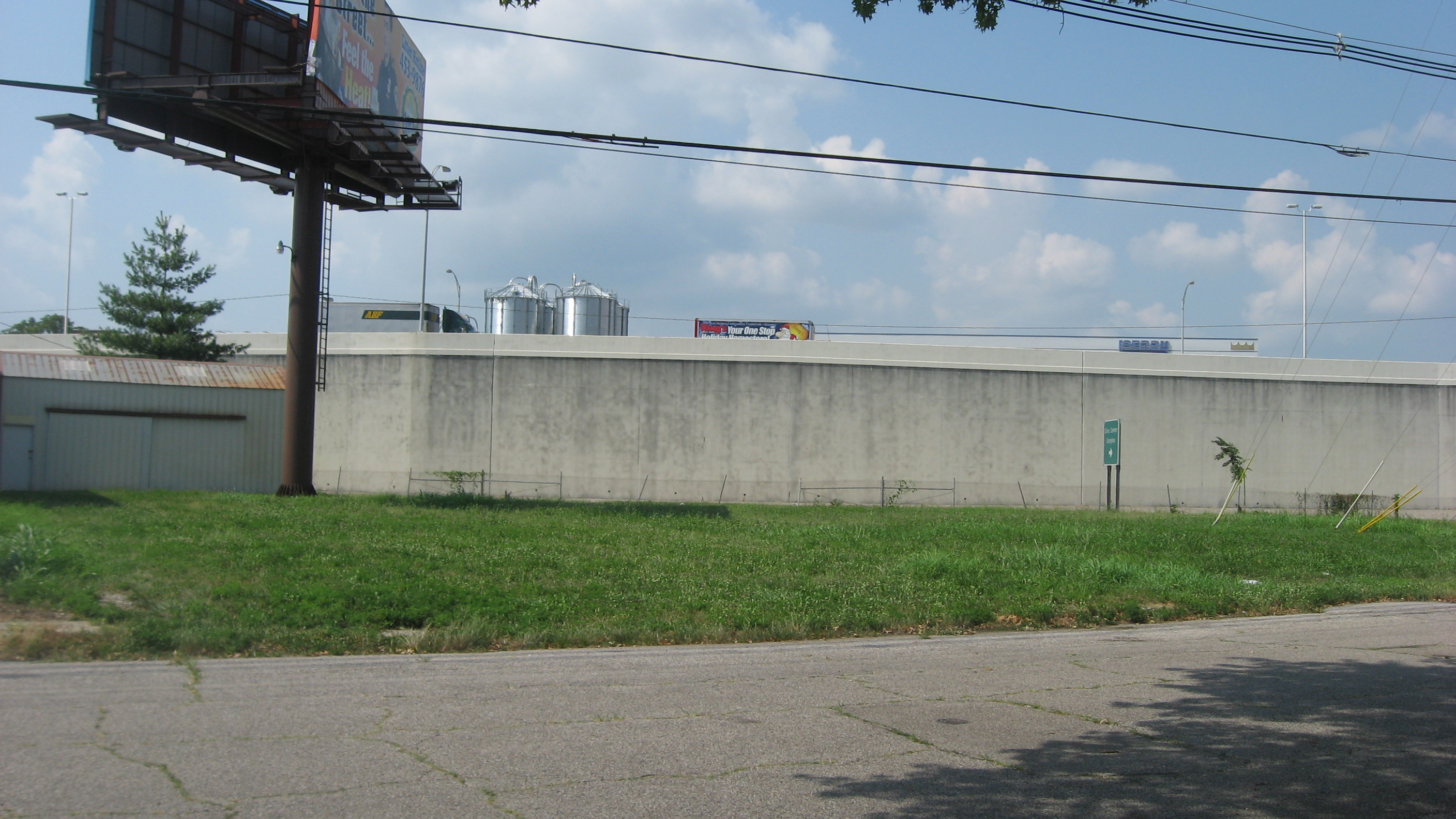
- August Kuehn House site, July 2011

- Location within Indiana Location within the United States
- Location: 608-610 Ingel St., Evansville, Indiana
- Coordinates: 37°58′35″N 87°34′18″W
- Area: less than one acre
- Built: 1864
- MPS: Downtown Evansville MRA
- NRHP reference No.: 82000105
- Added to NRHP: July 1, 1982

August Kuehn House was a historic home located in downtown Evansville, Indiana. It was built in 1864. It has been demolished.

It was listed on the National Register of Historic Places in 1982.
