= Wabasha–Nelson Bridge =

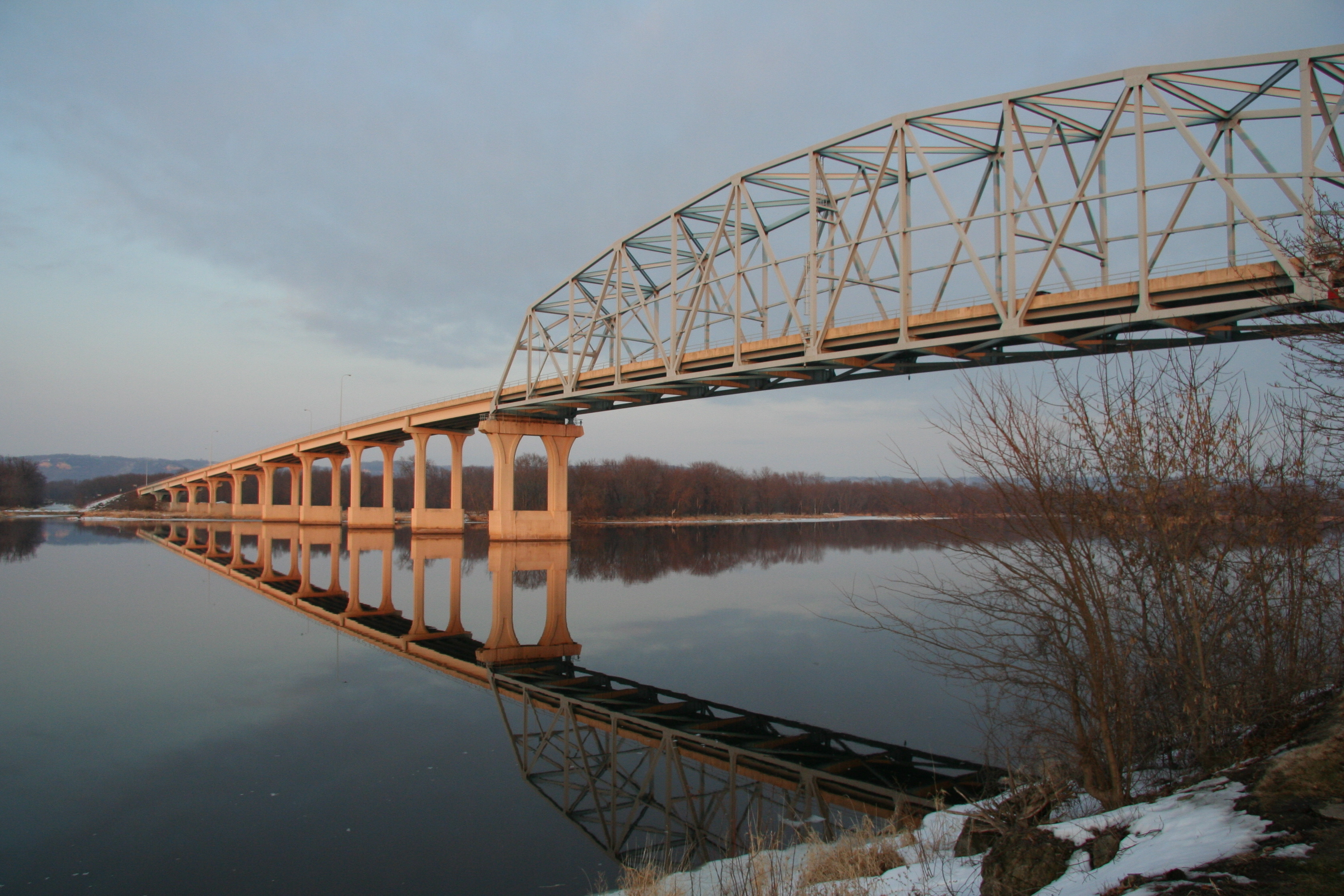
- The bridge reflected in the Mississippi River, seen from upstream on the Minnesota side
- Coordinates: 44°23′11″N 92°01′56.5″W
- Carries: Two lanes of MN 60 and WIS 25
- Crosses: Mississippi River
- Locale: Wabasha, Minnesota
- Maintained by: Minnesota Department of Transportation
- ID number: 79000 (Minnesota), B-6-0079 (Wisconsin)

Characteristics
- Design: Truss bridge
- Total length: 2462 feet
- Longest span: 470 feet
- Clearance below: 62 feet

History
- Opened: 1988

The Wabasha–Nelson Bridge is a truss bridge that connects Wabasha, Minnesota with Nelson, Wisconsin, crossing the Mississippi River. The bridge has a street setup, with one lane for motor vehicles in each direction. It carries Minnesota State Highway 60 and WI 25.

The current bridge replaced a bridge built in 1931 that was only 19 feet wide and had two right angles on the Minnesota side. The bridge was constructed in a unique way: the 470-foot truss span was built on falsework on two barges out of the current and the main river channel. When the truss section was completed, engineers floated the span on its barges down the river. The bridge was positioned higher than the supports so it could be brought into place. Once the span was in place, the barges were flooded to bring the bridge into position vertically. This operation took only eight hours to complete.

Through legislation passed in 2014, the bridge was named "Michael Duane Clickner Memorial Bridge", honoring a Wabasha native killed during the Vietnam War.

== See also ==
- List of crossings of the Upper Mississippi River
