= Wabasha, Minnesota =

- City
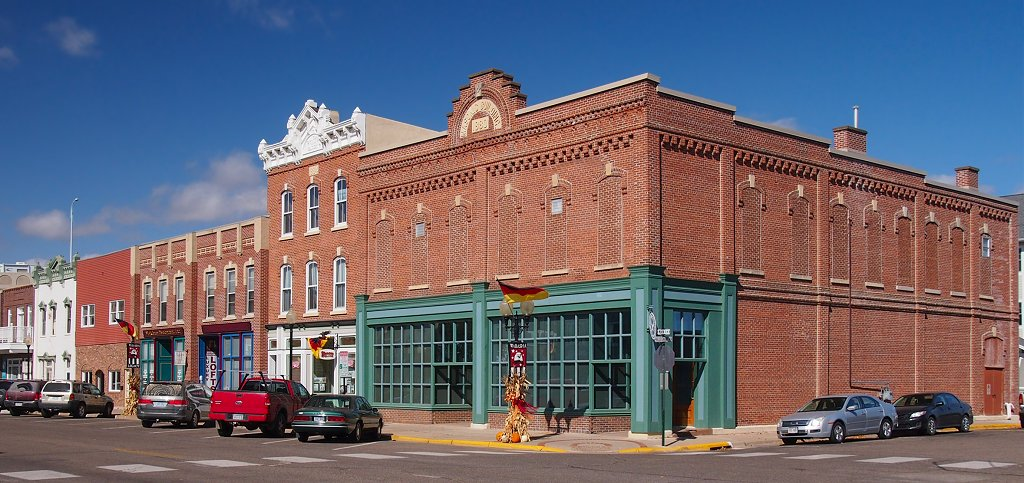
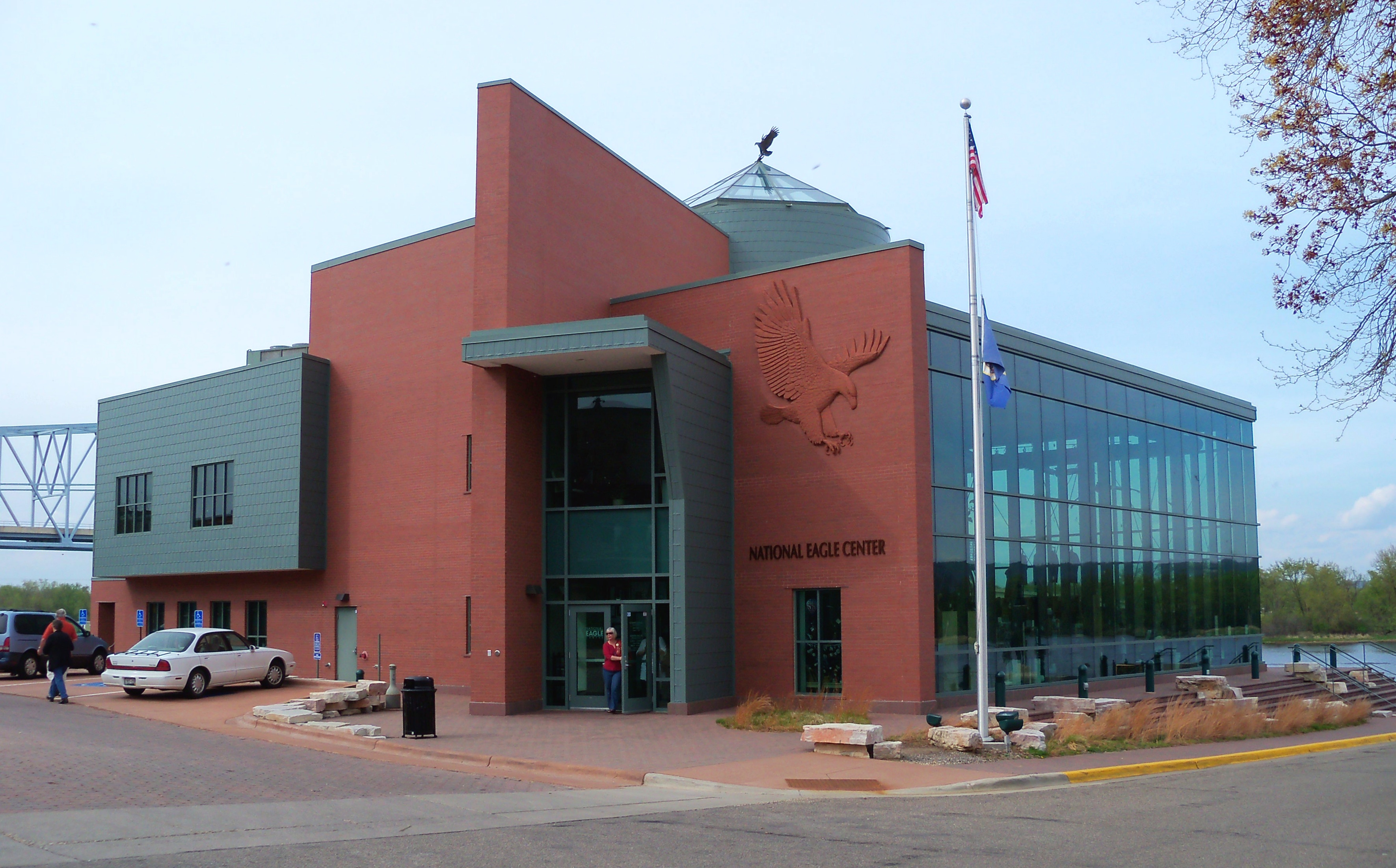
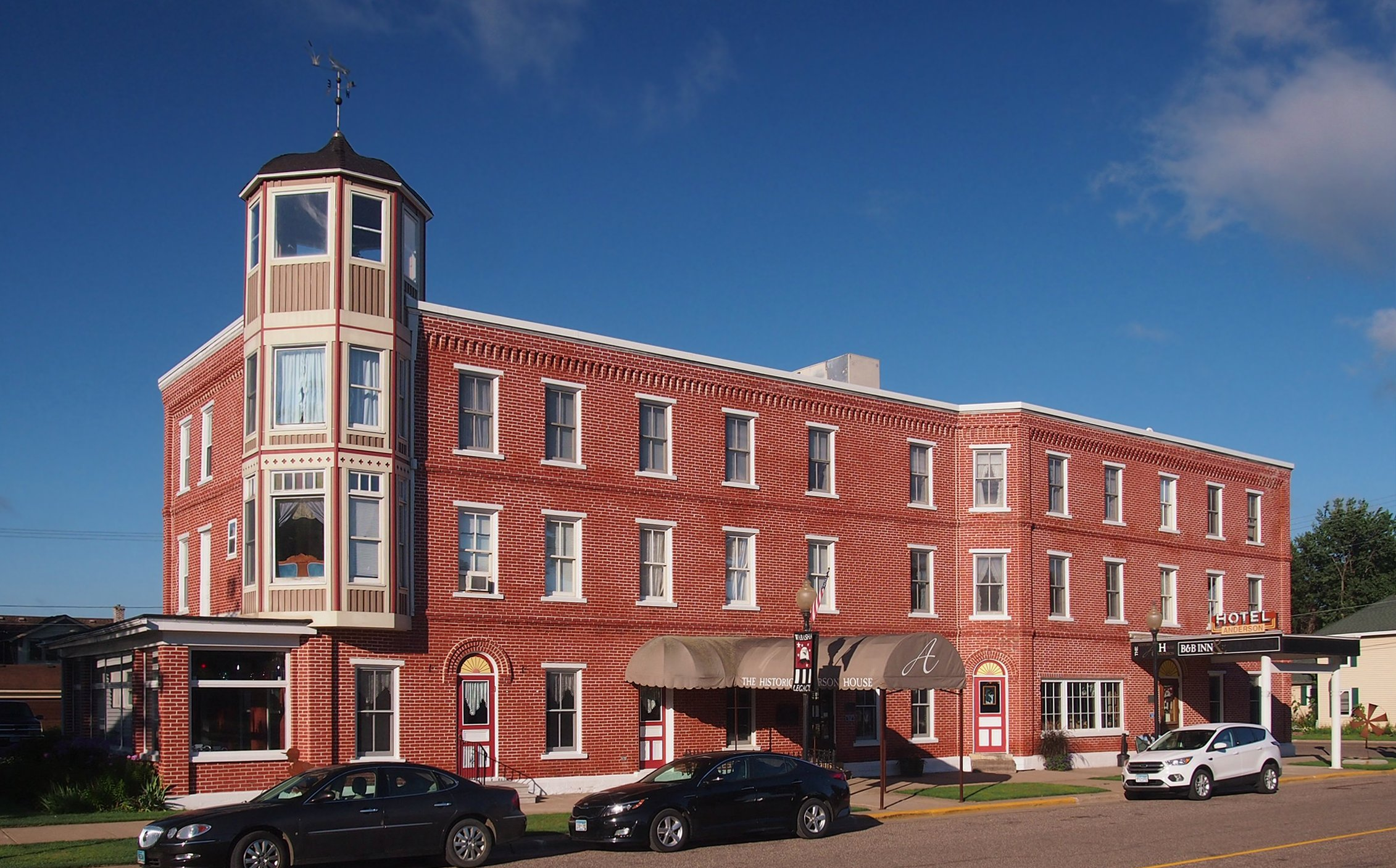
- Downtown National Eagle Center Anderson House Hotel
- Motto: "Governor's Fit City"
- Location of the city of Wabasha within Wabasha County in the state of Minnesota
- Coordinates: 44°22′46″N 92°2′8″W
- Country: United States
- State: Minnesota
- County: Wabasha

Area
  - Total: 9.25 sq mi (23.96 km^{2})
  - Land: 8.19 sq mi (21.22 km^{2})
  - Water: 1.06 sq mi (2.75 km^{2})
- Elevation: 686 ft (209 m)

Population (2020)
  - Total: 2,559
  - Density: 312.4/sq mi (120.62/km^{2})
- Time zone: UTC-6 (Central (CST))
  - Summer (DST): UTC-5 (CDT)
- ZIP code: 55981
- Area code: 651
- FIPS code: 27-67378
- GNIS feature ID: 0653695
- Website: www.wabasha.org

Wabasha is a city and the county seat of Wabasha County, Minnesota, United States. The population was 2,559 at the time of the 2020 census. It is on the Mississippi River, near its confluence with the Zumbro River.

== Name ==
Wabasha is named after the Mdewakanton Dakota mixed-blood (with Anishinaabe) chiefs Wapi-sha, or red leaf (wáȟpe šá - "leaf red"), father, son, and grandson of the same name. Wabishaw II signed the 1830 U.S. treaty with the "Confederated Tribes of the Sacs and Foxes; the Medawah-Kanton, Wahpacoota, Wahpeton and Sissetong Bands or Tribes of Sioux; the Omahas, Ioways, Ottoes and Missourias" in Prairie du Chien. Wabasha III signed the 1851 and 1858 treaties that ceded the southern half of what is now Minnesota to the U.S., beginning the removal of his band to the Minnesota River, then to Crow Creek Reservation in Dakota Territory, then to the Santee Reservation in Nebraska, where Wabasha III died.

== History ==
Wabasha was platted in 1854.

== Geography ==
According to the United States Census Bureau, Wabasha has an area of 9.25 square miles (23.96 km^{2}); 8.19 square miles (21.21 km^{2}) is land and 1.06 square miles (2.75 km^{2}) is water. U.S. Highway 61 and Minnesota Highway 60 are two of the city's main routes Wisconsin Highways 25 and 35 are nearby.

Wabasha is on the Mississippi River at the foot of Lake Pepin.

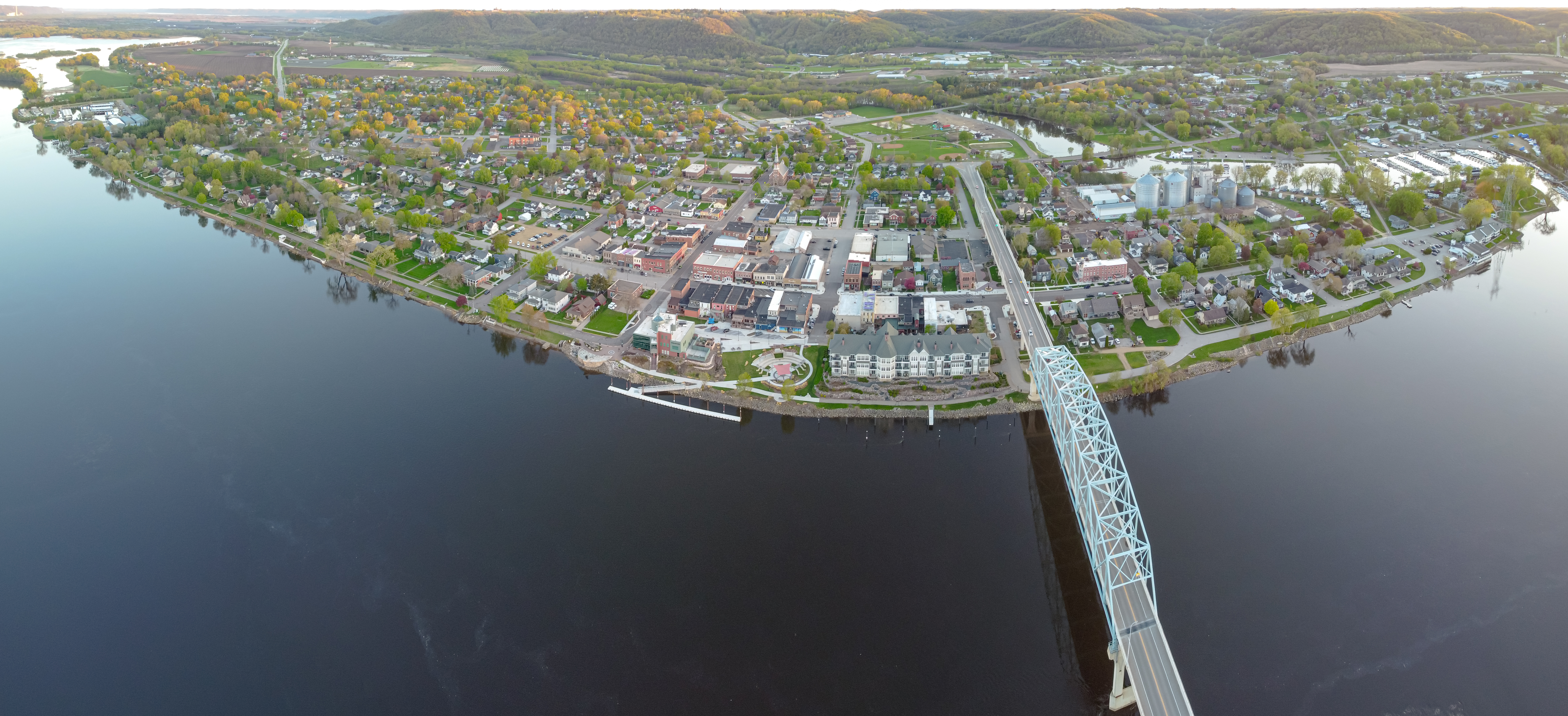

=== Climate ===
The Köppen Climate Classification subtype for this climate is "Dfb"(Warm Summer Continental Climate).

== Demographics ==
Historical population
Census	Pop.	Note	%±
1860	894		—
1870	1,739		94.5%
1880	2,088		20.1%
1890	2,489		19.2%
1900	2,528		1.6%
1910	2,622		3.7%
1920	2,249		−14.2%
1930	2,212		−1.6%
1940	2,368		7.1%
1950	2,468		4.2%
1960	2,500		1.3%
1970	2,371		−5.2%
1980	2,372		0.0%
1990	2,384		0.5%
2000	2,599		9.0%
2010	2,521		−3.0%
2020	2,559		1.5%
U.S. Decennial Census

=== 2020 census ===
As of the 2020 census, Wabasha had a population of 2,559. The median age was 56.0 years; 15.1% of residents were under age 18 and 35.0% were age 65 or older. For every 100 females, there were 90.1 males, and for every 100 females age 18 and over, there were 87.1 males.

0.0% of residents lived in urban areas, while 100.0% lived in rural areas.

There were 1,172 households, of which 18.1% had children under age 18 living in them. Of all households, 42.8% were married-couple households, 22.4% had a male householder with no spouse or partner present, and 28.8% had a female householder with no spouse or partner present. About 39.6% of households were made up of individuals, and 20.2% had someone living alone who was 65 years of age or older.

There were 1,344 housing units at an average density of 164.1 per square mile (63.4/km^{2}). The population density was 312.4 inhabitants per square mile (120.6/km^{2}). Of all housing units, 12.8% were vacant. The homeowner vacancy rate was 1.8%, and the rental vacancy rate was 5.7%.

Racial composition as of the 2020 census
Race	Number	Percent
White	2,380	93.0%
Black or African American	36	1.4%
American Indian and Alaska Native	7	0.3%
Asian	10	0.4%
Native Hawaiian and Other Pacific Islander	4	0.2%
Some other race	16	0.6%
Two or more races	106	4.1%
Hispanic or Latino (of any race)	66	2.6%

=== 2010 census ===
As of the census of 2010, there were 2,521 people, 1,144 households, and 654 families living in the city. The population density was 306.7 inhabitants per square mile (118.4/km^{2}). There were 1,315 housing units at an average density of 160.0 per square mile (61.8/km^{2}). The racial makeup of the city was 96.2% White, 0.8% African American, 0.4% Native American, 0.2% Asian, 1.0% from other races, and 1.3% from two or more races. Hispanic or Latino of any race were 2.3% of the population.

There were 1,144 households, of which 23.1% had children under the age of 18 living with them, 44.2% were married couples living together, 9.4% had a female householder with no husband present, 3.5% had a male householder with no wife present, and 42.8% were non-families. 37.9% of all households were made up of individuals, and 17.1% had someone living alone who was 65 years of age or older. The average household size was 2.09 and the average family size was 2.72.

The median age in the city was 48.8 years. 19.4% of residents were under the age of 18; 5.5% were between the ages of 18 and 24; 20.1% were from 25 to 44; 28.2% were from 45 to 64; and 26.8% were 65 years of age or older. The gender makeup of the city was 47.2% male and 52.8% female.

=== 2000 census ===
As of the census of 2000, there were 2,599 people, 1,062 households, and 665 families living in the city. The population density was 318.4 inhabitants per square mile (122.9/km^{2}). There were 1,166 housing units at an average density of 142.9 per square mile (55.2/km^{2}). The racial makeup of the city was 97.96% White, 0.69% African American, 0.54% Native American, 0.15% Asian, 0.19% from other races, and 0.46% from two or more races. Hispanic or Latino of any race were 0.31% of the population.

There were 1,062 households, out of which 26.4% had children under the age of 18 living with them, 52.5% were married couples living together, 7.7% had a female householder with no husband present, and 37.3% were non-families. 32.3% of all households were made up of individuals, and 15.4% had someone living alone who was 65 years of age or older. The average household size was 2.27 and the average family size was 2.85.

In the city, the population was spread out, with 22.0% under the age of 18, 6.3% from 18 to 24, 23.3% from 25 to 44, 25.9% from 45 to 64, and 22.4% who were 65 years of age or older. The median age was 44 years. For every 100 females, there were 90.0 males. For every 100 females age 18 and over, there were 84.2 males.

The median income for a household in the city was $35,291, and the median income for a family was $45,391. Males had a median income of $34,223 versus $24,167 for females. The per capita income for the city was $20,374. About 5.2% of families and 10.0% of the population were below the poverty line, including 10.8% of those under age 18 and 14.3% of those age 65 or over.

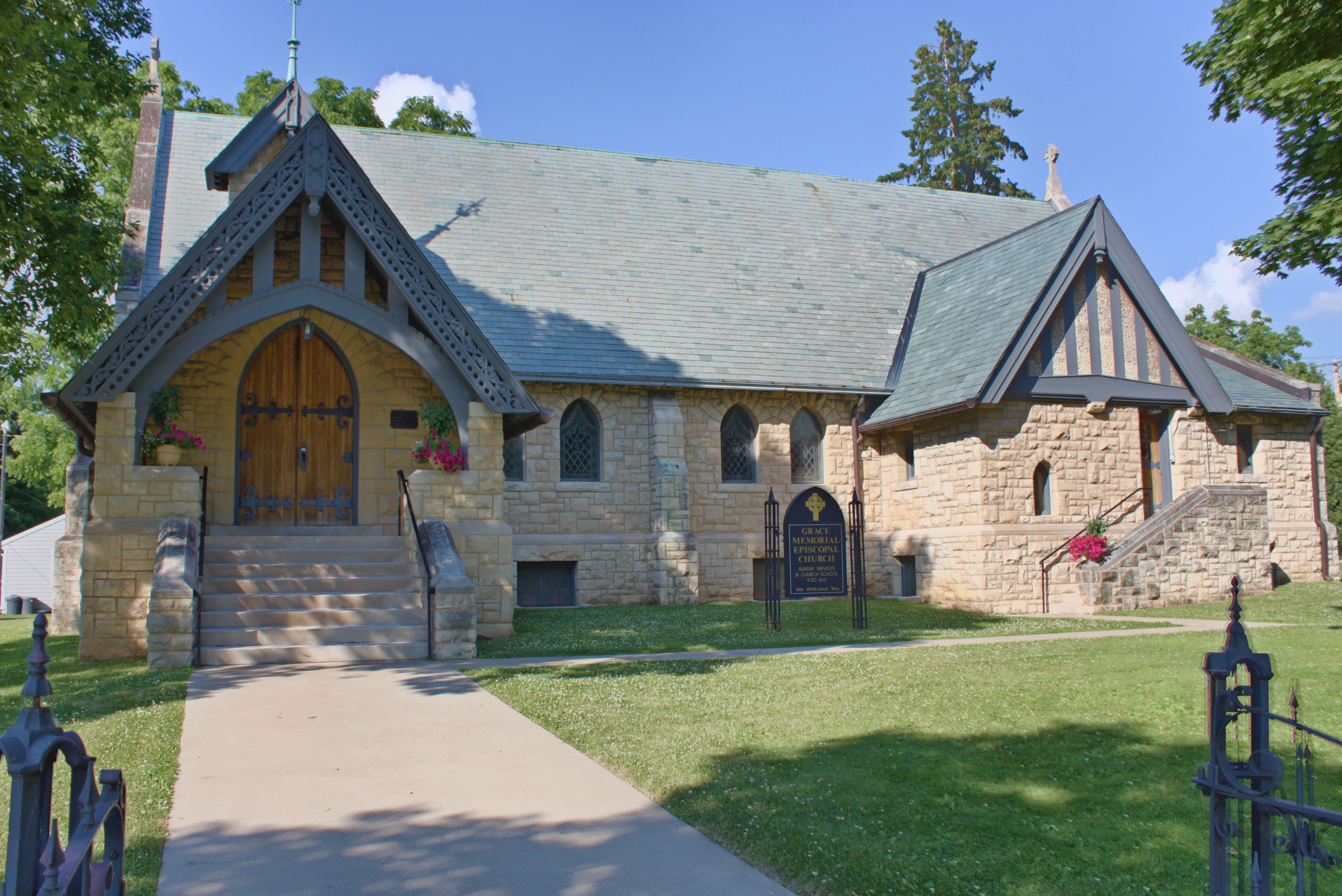
Grace Memorial Episcopal Church, Wabasha, Minnesota

== In popular culture ==
A sign reading "Welcome to Wabasha, Home of Grumpy Old Men" stands at the city limits. This is a tribute to the 1993 film Grumpy Old Men and its 1995 sequel Grumpier Old Men, both of which are set in Wabasha. Though many of the places the films mention (such as the local VFW and Slippery's Tavern) are in Wabasha, the films were shot in other Minnesota communities. The only scene filmed near Wabasha was the "snow angel" scene, filmed in Red Wing.

== Government ==
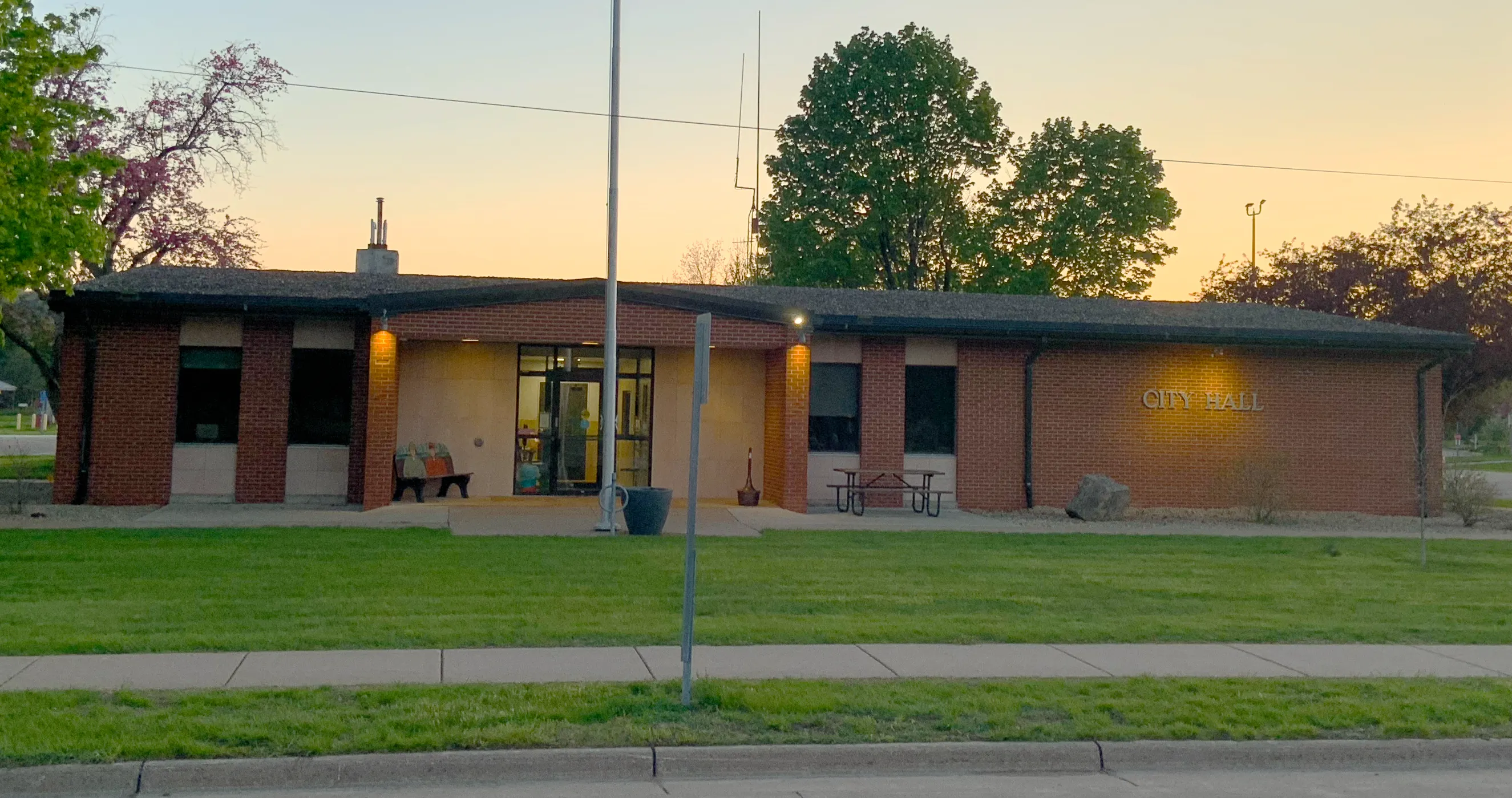
Wabasha City Hall

Wabasha is in Minnesota's 1st congressional district, represented by Brad Finstad, a Republican. Emily Durand is the mayor.

== Education ==
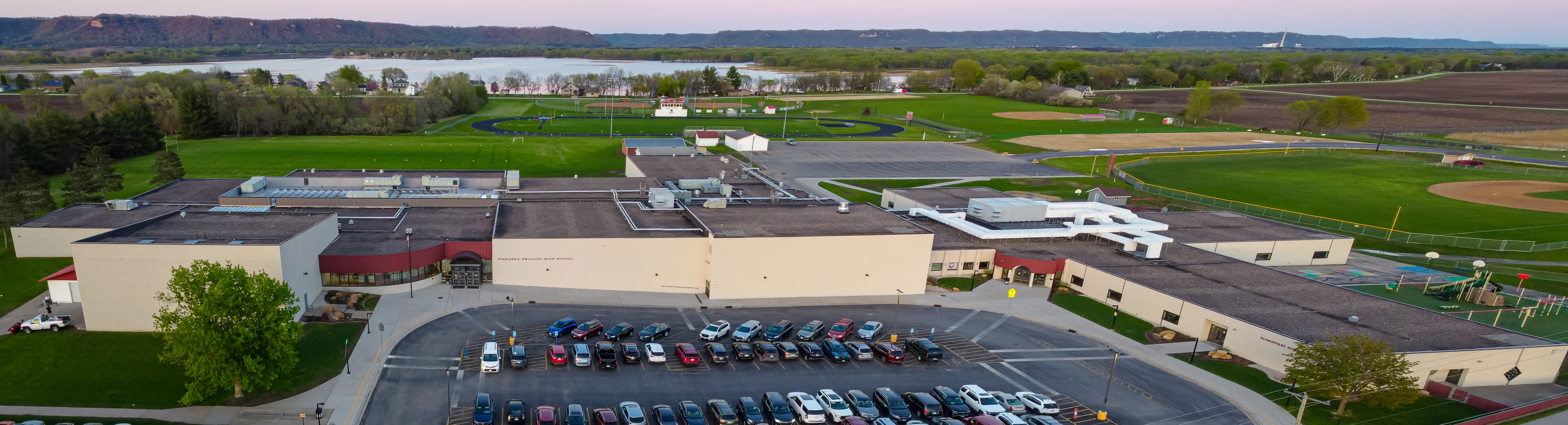
Wabasha-Kellogg High School

Run by Wabasha-Kellogg Independent School District #811, Wabasha-Kellogg is a K-12 school. St. Felix Catholic School is a private school offering a pre-K-6 curriculum.

== Arts and culture ==
The National Eagle Center is in Wabasha. Wabasha is also home to Minnesota's oldest Episcopal church, Grace Memorial Episcopal Church, which features a Tiffany stained-glass window.

== Transportation ==
Amtrak’s Empire Builder, which operates between Seattle/Portland and Chicago, passes through Wabasha on BNSF tracks, but does not stop. The nearest stations are in Red Wing, 31 miles (50 km) northwest, and Winona, 32 miles (51 km) southeast.

== Notable people ==
- Larry Brandenburg, actor
- Preston Cook, collector of American eagle imagery
- John R. Foley, congressman from Maryland
- Joyce M. Lund, journalist and Minnesota state legislator
- Chief Tamaha, Mdewakanton Sioux chief
- Tom Tiffany, U.S. representative for Wisconsin
- John Van Dyke, congressman from New Jersey's 4th congressional district from 1847 to 1851; Minnesota Senate member from 1872 to 1873
- Jim "Baron Von" Raschke, retired professional wrestler and manager
