= Modena (disambiguation) =

Modena is a city in northern Italy.

Modena may also refer to:

== Places ==
- Duchy of Modena and Reggio
- El Modena, California
- Modena, Illinois
- Modena, Missouri
- Modena, New York
- Modena, Pennsylvania
- Modena, Utah
- Modena, Wisconsin, a town
- Modena (community), Wisconsin, an unincorporated community
- Province of Modena, Italy

== Transportation ==
- Ferrari 360 Modena, a model of the Ferrari 360
- Modenas, a Malaysian motorcycle company

== Sports ==
- Modena F.C. 2018, a football club in Modena, Italy
- Modena (racing team), a Formula One team from Modena, Italy

== Buildings ==
- Duomo di Modena, a cathedral in Modena, Italy
- Palais Modena, a palace in Vienna, Austria

== People ==
- Fiammetta Modena (born 1965), Italian politician
- Stefano Modena (born 1963), Italian Formula One driver
- Vasco Modena (1929–2016), Italian racing cyclist
- Mary of Modena, queen consort of King James II of England and VII of Scotland
- Leon of Modena (1571–1648), Jewish scholar
- Wiligelmus, Gulielmo da Modena, or Guglielmo da Modena (1099? - 1120), Italian sculptor
- William of Modena, Bishop of Modena in 1221

See also

- Duke of Ferrara and of Modena

== Other ==
- Modena pigeon, a breed of domestic pigeon
- Gospel Book (Modena, Biblioteca Estense, Gr. I), a late tenth century illuminated Byzantine Gospel Book
- Modena City Ramblers, an Italian folk-rock band
- University of Modena and Reggio Emilia
- 37 Mountain Infantry Division Modena, an Italian division of World War II
