= Jeffrey D. Fisher =

American author and professor

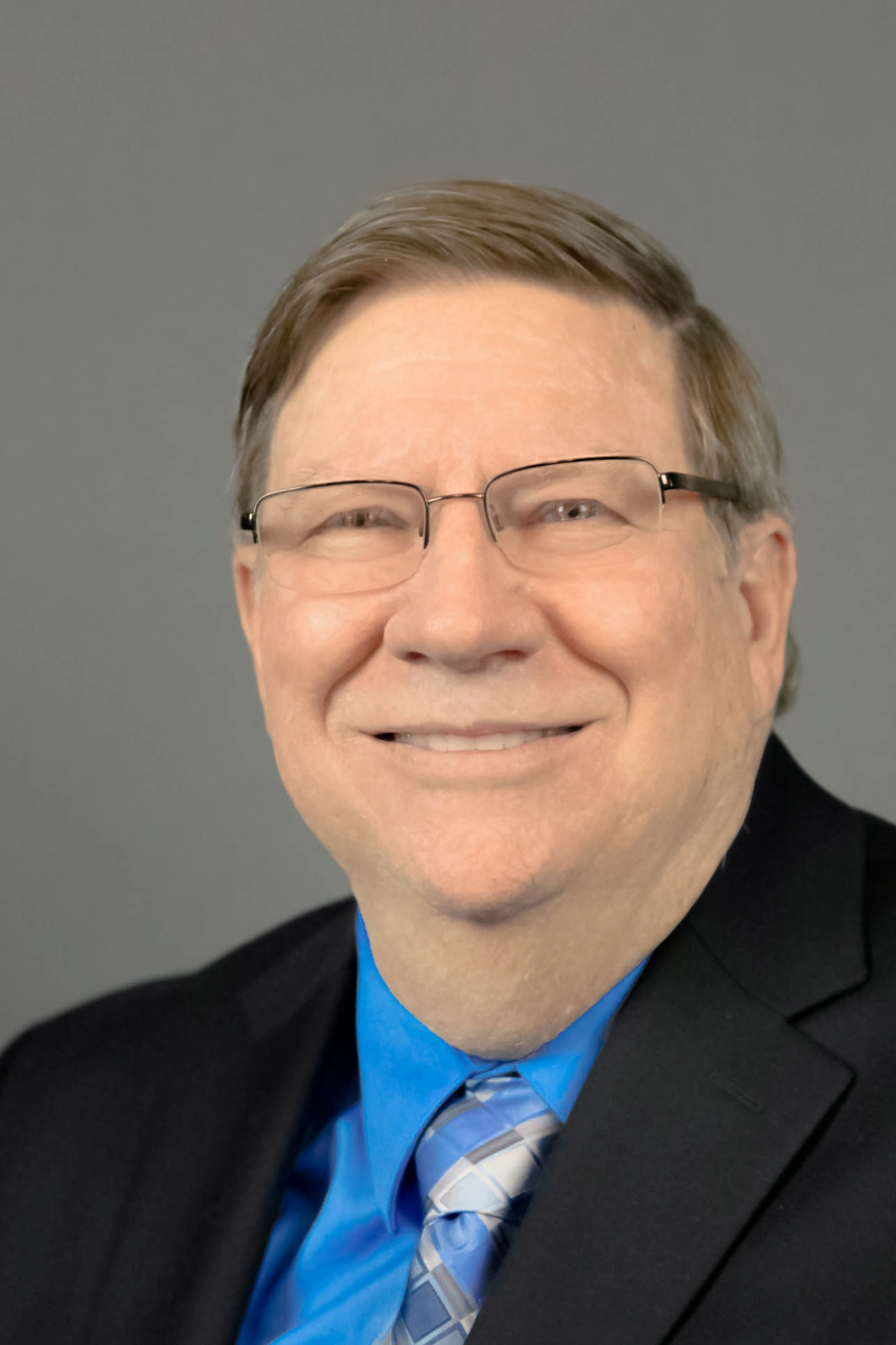
- Known for: Real Estate Finance and Investments

Academic background
- Education: Wright State University; Purdue University
- Alma mater: Ohio State University

Academic work
- Discipline: Research and Education
- Institutions: Indiana University Kelley School of Business

Jeffrey D. Fisher is an American author and professor emeritus of real estate at the Indiana University Kelley School of Business, where he was the founding director of the Center for Real Estate Studies and Charles H. and Barbara F. Dunn Professor of Finance and Real Estate. He is also a visiting professor at Johns Hopkins University and serves on the advisory committee of Sterling Valuation Group. Fisher is president of the Homer Hoyt Institute and acts as a research and education consultant to the National Council of Real Estate Investment Fiduciaries (NCREIF). He is a founding partner in the Pavonis Group and a board member of RealNex.

== Education ==
Fisher holds a doctorate in real estate from The Ohio State University, an MBA from Wright State University, and an undergraduate degree in management from Purdue University1457.

== Career ==
Fisher began his academic career in the 1970s, teaching at Wright State University and later at Wittenberg University and The Ohio State University. In 1979, he joined Indiana University, where he held various academic and leadership positions, including Assistant Professor, Associate Professor, Director of the Center for Real Estate Studies (established in 1985), and ultimately Charles Dunn Professor of Finance and Real Estate. He was named Professor Emeritus in 2011 and has served as Visiting Professor at Johns Hopkins University since 2016.

== Scholarly Works ==
Fisher is the coauthor of several foundational textbooks in the field of real estate, including Real Estate Finance and Investments (with William Brueggeman, McGraw-Hill), a leading textbook widely adopted in academic programs globally, translated into Japanese, Korean, and Chinese. In 2024, it was named one of the “50 Greatest Commercial Real Estate Books of All Time” by Propmodo, recognized as the only academic textbook on the list and described as “a cornerstone of real estate education
