= IBRC =

IBRC can refer to:

- Indiana Business Research Center, United States, provides economic information
- Irish Bank Resolution Corporation, state company formed from failed banks
- Insurance Brokers Registration Council, United Kingdom, set up under the Insurance Brokers (Registration) Act 1977
