= Urne, Wisconsin =

- Unincorporated community
- Location within Wisconsin Location within the United States
- Coordinates: 44°29′55″N 91°53′33″W
- Country: United States
- State: Wisconsin
- County: Buffalo
- Towns: Nelson, Modena
- Elevation: 823 ft (251 m)
- Time zone: UTC-6 (Central (CST))
  - Summer (DST): UTC-5 (CDT)
- Area codes: 715 & 534
- GNIS feature ID: 1576006

Urne (/ˈɜːrni/ UR-nee) is an unincorporated community located in the towns of Nelson and Modena, Buffalo County, Wisconsin, United States. Urne is located at the junction of County Highways F and K, 8 miles (13 km) northeast of the village of Nelson. The community was named after Ole J. Urne, a Norwegian immigrant who arrived in 1865. The post office was created in March 1873 as Urne's Corners.
