= Jeff Sagarin =

American sports statistician (born 1948)

Jeff Sagarin (born 1948) is an American sports statistician known for his development of a method for ranking and rating sports teams in a variety of sports. His Sagarin Ratings have been a regular feature in the USA Today sports section from 1985 to 2023, have been used by the NCAA Tournament Selection Committee to help determine the participants in the NCAA Men's Division I Basketball Championship tournament since 1984, and were part of the college football Bowl Championship Series throughout its history from 1998 to 2014.

== Background ==
Sagarin attended New Rochelle High School, earned a Bachelor of Science in mathematics from the Massachusetts Institute of Technology in 1970 and an M.B.A. from Indiana University School of Business in 1983. He grew up outside New York City in Westchester County in New Rochelle, New York. In 1977 he moved to Bloomington, Indiana. In 1986 he created the computer game Hoops with Wayne L. Winston.

== Method ==
Sagarin, like the developers of many other sports rating systems, does not divulge the exact methods behind his system. He offers two rating systems, each of which gives each team a certain number of points. One system, "Elo chess," is presumably based on the Elo rating system used internationally to rank chess players. This system uses only wins and losses with no reference to the victory margin. The other system, "Predictor," takes victory margin into account. For that system the difference in two teams' rating scores is meant to predict the margin of victory for the stronger team at a neutral venue. For both systems teams gain higher ratings within the Sagarin system by winning games against stronger opponents, factoring in such things as home-venue advantage. For the Predictor system, margin of victory (or defeat) factors in also, but a law of diminishing returns is applied. Therefore, a football team that wins a game by a margin of 7–6 is rewarded less than a team that defeats the same opponent under the same circumstances 21–7, but a team that wins a game by a margin of 35–0 receives similar ratings to a team that defeats the same opponent 70–0. This characteristic has the effect of recognizing "comfortable" victories, while limiting the reward for running up the score.

At the beginning of a season, when only a few games have been played, a Bayesian network weighted by starting rankings is used as long as there are whole groups of teams that have not played one another, but once the graph is well-connected, the weights are no longer needed. Sagarin claims that from that point, the rankings are unbiased.

== Justification ==
Sagarin's ratings are particularly relevant in the world of American college football and basketball, where, with hundreds of teams in NCAA Division I competition, there is no way a team can play against more than a small fraction of its competitors. Therefore, in determining the participants in championship games and tournaments, it is necessary to distinguish between teams that have compiled impressive win–loss records against strong competition and teams that have defeated weaker opponents.

In addition, sports rating systems are generally of great interest to gamblers. Gamblers use Sagarin's ratings as a source of "Power Ratings," traditionally used as a way to determine the spread between two teams.

== Winval ==
Along with his former MIT classmate Wayne L. Winston, a professor of decision sciences at Indiana University, as of 2004, Sagarin advised the Dallas Mavericks about which lineups to use during games and which free agents to sign using a system called Winval. Winval is modeled after hockey's plus–minus system.
