= Schuyler F. Otteson =

American academic (1917–2001)

Schuyler Otteson
- Born: July 17, 1917; Modena, Wisconsin
- Died: February 5, 2001 (aged 83); Bloomington, Indiana
- Education: University of Wisconsin–Eau Claire; Northwestern University; Ohio State University
- Occupations: professor Administrator

Schuyler Franklin Otteson (July 17, 1917 – February 5, 2001) was a dean of the Kelley School of Business at Indiana University.

== Life and education ==
Otteson (often called "Ott" or "Skike") was born on July 17, 1917, in Modena, Wisconsin. His father was the owner of a country store where Otteson often worked while he was growing up. His time at the store led to his interest in business and marketing. Otteson attended the University of Wisconsin-Eau Claire, Northwestern University and Ohio State University. Otteson died in Bloomington, Indiana on February 5, 2001. He was the father of four children: Judy, Marty, Karn, and John.

== Career ==
While pursuing a Ph.D. at Ohio State University, Otteson worked at Ohio Wesleyan University and eventually served on the faculty of Indiana University as an assistant professor of marketing. In 1948 Otteson received his PhD and was promoted to professor of marketing in 1952. He served as Indiana University's sixth Dean of the School of Business from 1971 through 1982.

Otteson served as Director of the Bureau of Business Research (now the Indiana Business Research Center) from 1954 to 1960. During that time, he became the founding editor of Business Horizons, a scholarly journal. Otteson also edited a 14-volume study for the Governor of Indiana "which influenced state economic policy into the 1960s."

In 1960, Otteson was appointed as the chair of the Marketing Department and also the chair of the Doctor of Business Administration program at Indiana. He also served as the national president of the American Marketing Association from 1965 to 1966 and was a member of the executive committee of the U.S. Department of Commerce's National Marketing Advisory Committee. From 1966 to 1968, Otteson was secretary and member of the executive committee of the International Marketing Federation. Additionally, Otteson was on the Board of Governors of Beta Gamma Sigma, co-founded the Midwest Business Administration Association, and was appointed the president of the Indiana Academy of the Social Sciences.

During Otteson's years as dean, "the School of Business experienced a period of tremendous growth. When Otteson retired in December of 1982, the school had grown to include many more women and minorities, was routinely sending students to study abroad, and had gained the respect of the nation and world as a place to learn business administration." The Schuyler F. Otteson award is given to professors at Indiana who demonstrate excellence in teaching.
