= Michael Szymanczyk =

American CEO (born 1949)

- Born: Michael Edward Szymanczyk; 3 January 1949 (age 77); Washington, D.C., U.S.
- Education: Indiana University (BS)

Michael Edward Szymanczyk (born 3 January 1949) is a former chairman and CEO of Altria Group, from 2008 to 2012. He was chairman and CEO of Philip Morris Companies Inc from April 2002 to August 2002.

== Biography ==
Szymanczyk received a Bachelor of Science degree in finance from the Kelley School of Business of Indiana University in 1971. Szmanczyk played varsity basketball for Indiana University

He started his career at Procter & Gamble, working his way through their brand management path.

Prior to his appointment as chairman, Szymanczyk was president and CEO of Philip Morris USA from November 1997 to April 2002. He was Chief Operating Officer of Philip Morris USA from July 1997 to November 1997. He first joined Philip Morris USA as Senior Vice President, Sales, in October 1990.

== Philanthropy ==
Szymanczyk is on the board of trustees for the Virginia Foundation for Independent Colleges, the University of Richmond, and the Virginia Commonwealth University School of Engineering Foundation. He is also chairman of the Dean's advisory council for the school's Kelley School of Business.

Business positions
Preceded by Louis C. Camilleri	Chairman and CEO of Altria Group; 2008–2012	Succeeded by Martin Barrington
