= Nelson (town), Wisconsin =

Town in Buffalo County, Wisconsin

Nelson, Wisconsin
- Town
- Town of Nelson
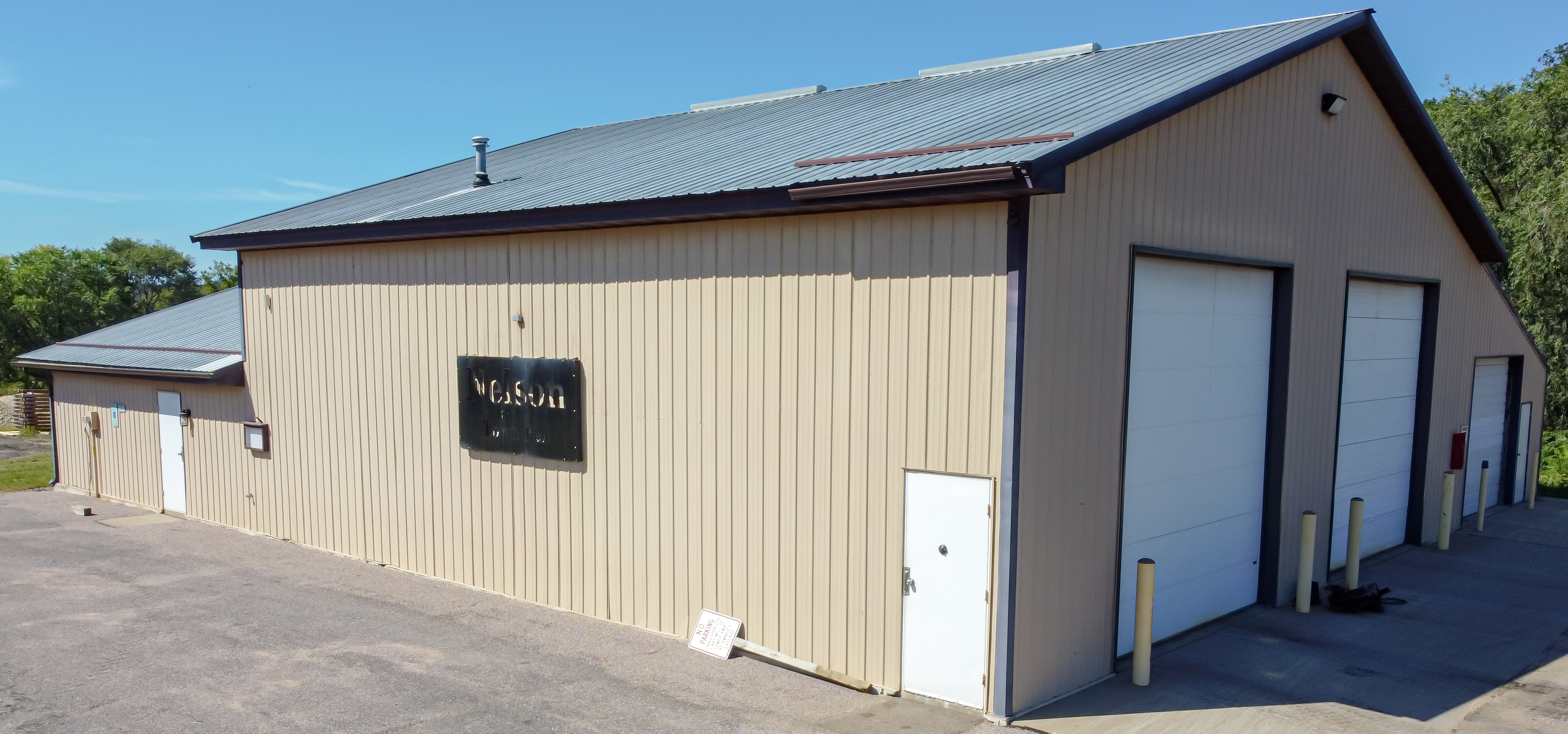
- Nelson Town Hall

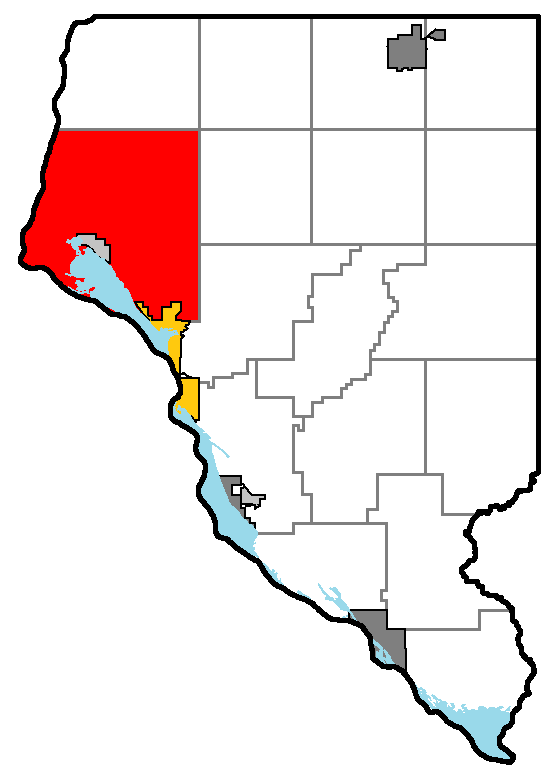
- Location of Nelson, Buffalo County

- Location of Buffalo County, Wisconsin
- Coordinates: 44°26′26″N 91°58′26″W
- Country: United States
- State: Wisconsin
- County: Buffalo

Area
  - Total: 77.63 sq mi (201.1 km^{2})
  - Land: 67.93 sq mi (175.9 km^{2})
  - Water: 9.7 sq mi (25 km^{2})

Population (2020)
  - Total: 574
  - Density: 8.45/sq mi (3.26/km^{2})
- Time zone: UTC-6 (Central (CST))
  - Summer (DST): UTC-5 (CDT)
- GNIS feature ID: 1583790

Nelson is a town in Buffalo County in the U.S. state of Wisconsin. The population was 574 at the 2020 census. The village of Nelson is located within the town. The unincorporated community of Misha Mokwa (/ˌmɪʃə ˈmɒkwə/ MISH-ə MOK-wə) and railroad junction Trevino are located in the town. The unincorporated community of Urne is located partially in the town.

== Geography ==
Nelson is located in western Buffalo County, along the Mississippi and Chippewa rivers. The Mississippi forms the southwestern border of the town, with Wabasha County, Minnesota, on the opposite shore. The Chippewa, a tributary of the Mississippi, forms the western border of the town, with Pepin County to the west.

The town of Nelson surrounds the village of Nelson, a separate municipality slightly southwest of the geographic center of the town. The city of Alma is along the town's southern border. The Wabasha–Nelson Bridge carries Wisconsin Highway 25 across the Mississippi River from Nelson village to the city of Wabasha, Minnesota.

According to the United States Census Bureau, the town of Nelson has a total area of 77.7 square miles (201.2 km^{2}), of which 68.0 square miles (176.1 km^{2}) is land and 9.7 square miles (25.1 km^{2}), or 12.48%, is water.

== Demographics ==
As of the census of 2000, there were 586 people, 221 households, and 167 families residing in the town. The population density was 8.3 people per square mile (3.2/km^{2}). There were 265 housing units at an average density of 3.8 per square mile (1.4/km^{2}). The racial makeup of the town was 98.29% White, 0.17% Black or African American, 1.19% Asian, and 0.34% from two or more races. 1.71% of the population were Hispanic or Latino of any race.

There were 221 households, out of which 31.7% had children under the age of 18 living with them, 68.3% were married couples living together, 5.0% had a female householder with no husband present, and 24.0% were non-families. 19.5% of all households were made up of individuals, and 8.1% had someone living alone who was 65 years of age or older. The average household size was 2.64 and the average family size was 3.04.

In the town, the population was spread out, with 22.5% under the age of 18, 7.0% from 18 to 24, 28.0% from 25 to 44, 29.4% from 45 to 64, and 13.1% who were 65 years of age or older. The median age was 42 years. For every 100 females, there were 114.7 males. For every 100 females age 18 and over, there were 114.2 males.

The median income for a household in the town was $44,063, and the median income for a family was $49,000. Males had a median income of $27,750 versus $22,917 for females. The per capita income for the town was $23,633. About 4.0% of families and 7.6% of the population were below the poverty line, including 14.0% of those under age 18 and 19.8% of those age 65 or over.

== Notable people ==
- James L. Hallock, farmer and politician, lived in the town
