= Janet Foutty =

American businesswoman

- Citizenship: United States
- Education: Indiana University Bloomington (BS, MBA)
- Occupations: Businessperson, author, public speaker
- Known for: CEO and chairperson of Deloitte Consulting

Janet Foutty is an American businessperson, author, and public speaker who formerly served as the CEO and chairperson of Deloitte Consulting LLP, a subsidiary of Deloitte LLP.

== Early life and education ==
Foutty grew up in Bethesda, Maryland. She earned her bachelor's degree in quantitative business analysis from Indiana University Bloomington and later earned her Master of Business Administration degree in finance from the Kelley School of Business.

== Career ==
Foutty was named as CEO and chairperson for Deloitte Consulting in 2015. During her tenure, she grew the business by $10 billion and led the company through the process of digital transformation. Prior to her time as CEO she led Deloitte's Federal and Technology businesses, including the launch of Deloitte Digital. In her role as chairperson, Foutty advocated for corporate adoption of technological trends, including the use of AI, stating that "not everyone on a [corporate] board needs to be a technologist, but it's important for all members to gain a foundational understanding of, and must be conversant in, the technologies that drive change and opportunity for the organization." In her leadership roles at Deloitte, Foutty was a "passionate advocate" for Diversity, Equity and Inclusion (DEI) in the workplace.

Foutty appeared as herself in the Deloitte-published comic book Ella the Engineer, a project to "give young girls a role model to inspire them to learn more about STEM".

In 2022, Foutty co-wrote Arrive and Thrive: 7 Impactful Practices for Women Navigating Leadership along with Dr. Lynn Perry Wooten, the president of Simmons University, and Susan MacKenty Brady, the CEO of Simmons University Institute for Inclusive Leadership. The book addresses the challenges women face in pursuing leadership positions, including occupational sexism, inequities, and career obstacles. According to Foutty, she wanted to discuss the issues of "equity and the truly systemic barriers that persist for women—economic mobility, professional advancement, health and well-being—they're so disproportionately skewed for women and even more so for those of racially and otherwise diverse backgrounds."

== Board memberships and associations ==
Foutty has served on the boards of multiple nonprofit organizations, including Catalyst, the Council on Competitiveness, and Bright Pink. Foutty has also served on the advisory boards of Columbia Law School's Millstein Center for Global Markets and Corporate Ownership and the New York University Stern School of Business Tech Advisory Board.

== Awards and honors ==
In 2016, Foutty was included on the "D.C.’s Top 50 Women in Technology" list of the federal technology news site FedScoop.

In 2020, Foutty was awarded the Bicentennial Medal by Indiana University for her distinguished service to the university.

== Personal life ==
Foutty is the mother of twins.

== Bibliography ==
- Arrive and Thrive: 7 Impactful Practices for Women Navigating Leadership. New York: McGraw Hill LLC (2022). ISBN 9781264286355
