= Hoops (1986 video game) =

1986 video game

- Running on an IBM PC
- Developer: Hoops
- Publisher: Hoops
- Designers: Jeff Sagarin; Wayne Winston; Billy Packer
- Programmer: Jim Klopfenstein
- Platform: IBM PC
- Release: 1986
- Genre: Sports

Hoops is a college basketball-themed 1986 video game published by Hoops for IBM PC compatible computers written by Jeff Sagarin and Wayne Winston, with additional coding done by Jim Klopfenstein. Billy Packer, the CBS basketball analyst, also provided defensive rating statistics for the game. The publisher ("Hoops") was run by Sagarin and Winston, and the game was sold only by mail order.

== Gameplay ==
Hoops is a game in which over 200 college basketball teams are playable in a text-only game, with strategy being changeable during the game by key-inputs. The teams featured in the game included historical teams starting from the 1950 CCNY basketball team to the 43 best rated college basketballs teams of 1986. The player selects teams to play against each other and players from each team that would be picked for the game, and then follow the game via a text-based play-by-play and scoreboard. In-game options include giving one team a home-court advantage or playing on a neutral court.

In later editions of the game, the number of teams is increased to 428, fatigue was added as a factor in game-play, and 3-point field goals had also been enabled.

== Development ==
The game began as a table-top game played using cards and dice developed by Winston, but this version proved laborious and time-consuming to play. When Sagarin, a friend of Winston's who worked rating basketball teams for a number of newspapers, bought a computer in 1985, Sagarin suggested converting Winston's table-top game into a computer game. Winston then enlisted Klopfenstein to program the game, and Packer was brought in to provide defensive statistics.

== Reception ==
Reception of the game was broadly positive. Rick Teverbaugh reviewed the game for Computer Gaming World, and stated that "The game is full of flavor, full of teams and full of options that should delight even the most demanding fan of the cage sport. Hoops is steadfast in its perspective." Ed Burns, writing in Sports Illustrated in 1987, described the game as "extremely sophisticated yet marvelously easy to play", though he also criticised the fact that players did not get tired in the version he reviewed, and that the play-by-play notices were insufficiently tailored to individual players.

Writing in March 1990 for Strat-O-Matic's Strat-O-Matic Review magazine, Bart Ewing gave the game a negative review, stating that the game was boring, had too many fouls, and no way of keeping statistics from game to game, would be better with player cards, and that the player playing as coach has too little control over the game. A later May 1990 review in the same magazine written by Patrick E. Clark disagreed with this view, stating that Hoops was "a better game than I could ever imagined".

== Legacy ==
Winston went on to become a Professor Emeritus of Decision and Information Systems at Indiana University, and Sagarin became a well-known sports statistician.
