= Cheng Wai Keung =

Singaporean business magnate (born 1951)

- Born: 1951 (age 74–75); Hong Kong
- Education: Indiana University School of Business; University of Chicago
- Occupations: Business magnate, judicial officer
- Years active: 1974—present
- Known for: Chairman of Wing Tai Holdings
- Office: Deputy Chairman of Temasek Holdings (1974–present)
- Spouse: Helen
- Children: 3
- Parent(s): Cheng Yik Hung (father); Chan Lan Yue (mother)

Cheng Wai Keung, DUBC (born 1951) is a Singaporean business magnate and judicial officer. Cheng is the chairman and managing director of property firm Wing Tai Holdings, a real estate developer and lifestyle retailer, which he co-owns with his three brothers. Cheng previously served as the deputy chairman of Temasek Holdings.

== Early life and education ==
Born 1951 in Hong Kong, Cheng Wai Keung's father Cheng Yik Hung manufactured garments. His mother was Chan Lan Yue, a homemaker. In 1955, the elder Cheng established the clothing firm Wing Tai Garment Manufactory, later renamed to Wing Tai Holdings Limited after the company changed its focus from garments to real estate. After graduating from Indiana University School of Business in 1971 with a Bachelor's in Science, the younger Cheng further pursued his education by completing a Business Administration master's degree course at the University of Chicago in 1973.

== Career ==
=== Wing Tai ===
Cheng was Wing Tai's assistant managing director from 1974 until 1984. On 2 December 1994, Cheng was appointed the chairman of Wing Tai. Following the death of their father in 2004, Cheng and his three brothers acquired the ownership of Wing Tai Holdings Limited.

=== Other endeavours ===
In addition to his status at Wing Tai, Cheng has held or currently holds positions at many other bodies and firms. From 1991 to 29 July 2009, Cheng was part of the directorial board of GP Batteries; he had earlier on quit as its chairman in 1997. From 1995 to 2000, he was the chairman of Power Seraya and from 1997 to 2002, he chaired MediaCorp TV Singapore. On 27 April 2001, Cheng was elected as the chairman of Raffles Holdings Limited's directorial board. Up till April 2012, Cheng was the director of shipping organisation Neptune Orient Lines. He is currently also the vice-chairman of Singapore-Suzhou Township Development. Cheng is a member of both the Singapore-US Business Council and the Singapore-UK Business Council.

=== Wealth ===
In 2009, Forbes ranked him as the twenty-fifth richest person in Singapore. He slid down to number thirty-four in 2011. His wealth increased by more than twofold in 2013, pushing him up to number thirty in ranking. As of August 2013, Cheng had an estimated net worth of $755 million.

== Recognition ==
In 1987, Cheng was awarded the Public Service Star (Bintang Bakti Masyarakat). In 1997, he received the Public Service Star (Bar) (BBM-Lintang). In 2000, he was selected to be a Justice of the Peace in Singapore, a judicial position he has maintained ever since. In 2007, the Singapore Government presented Cheng with the Distinguished Service Order (Darjah Utama Bakti Cemerlang).

== Personal life ==
Cheng is married to Helen. They have three children. In April 2013, the couple put their 84,839 square feet (7,881.8 m^{2})-large private bungalow at No 33 Nassim Road in Singapore up for sale at a record-breaking asking price of between $250 and $300 million. The building has an "in-ground swimming pool and a full-sized tennis court".
