= James L. Hallock =

American politician

James Locy Hallock (January 25, 1823 – September 21, 1894) was an American carpenter, farmer, and politician.

Born in Pittston, Pennsylvania, Hallock worked as a carpenter and for the railroad. In 1852, Hallock went to California and took part in the California Gold Rush. In 1855, Hallock and his wife settled in the town of Nelson, Buffalo County, Wisconsin. Hallock was a farmer and raised cattle and horses. Hallock served as chairman of the Nelson Town Board and on the Buffalo County Board of Supervisors. In 1870, Hallock served in the Wisconsin State Assembly and was a Republican.
