= German Modena =

Breed of pigeon

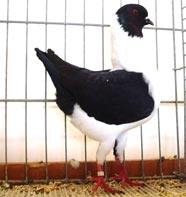
- Black Gazzi German Modena
- Conservation status: Common
- Country of origin: Germany

Classification
- US Breed Group: Fancy
- EE Breed Group: Utility Pigeons (Hen)

Notes
- One of two major variations of the Modena breed.

The German Modena (German: Deutsche Modeneser) is a breed of fancy pigeon developed over many years of selective breeding. German Modenas, along with other varieties of domesticated pigeons, are all descendants of the rock dove (Columba livia).

== Gallery ==
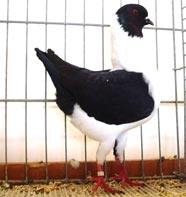
Black Gazzi

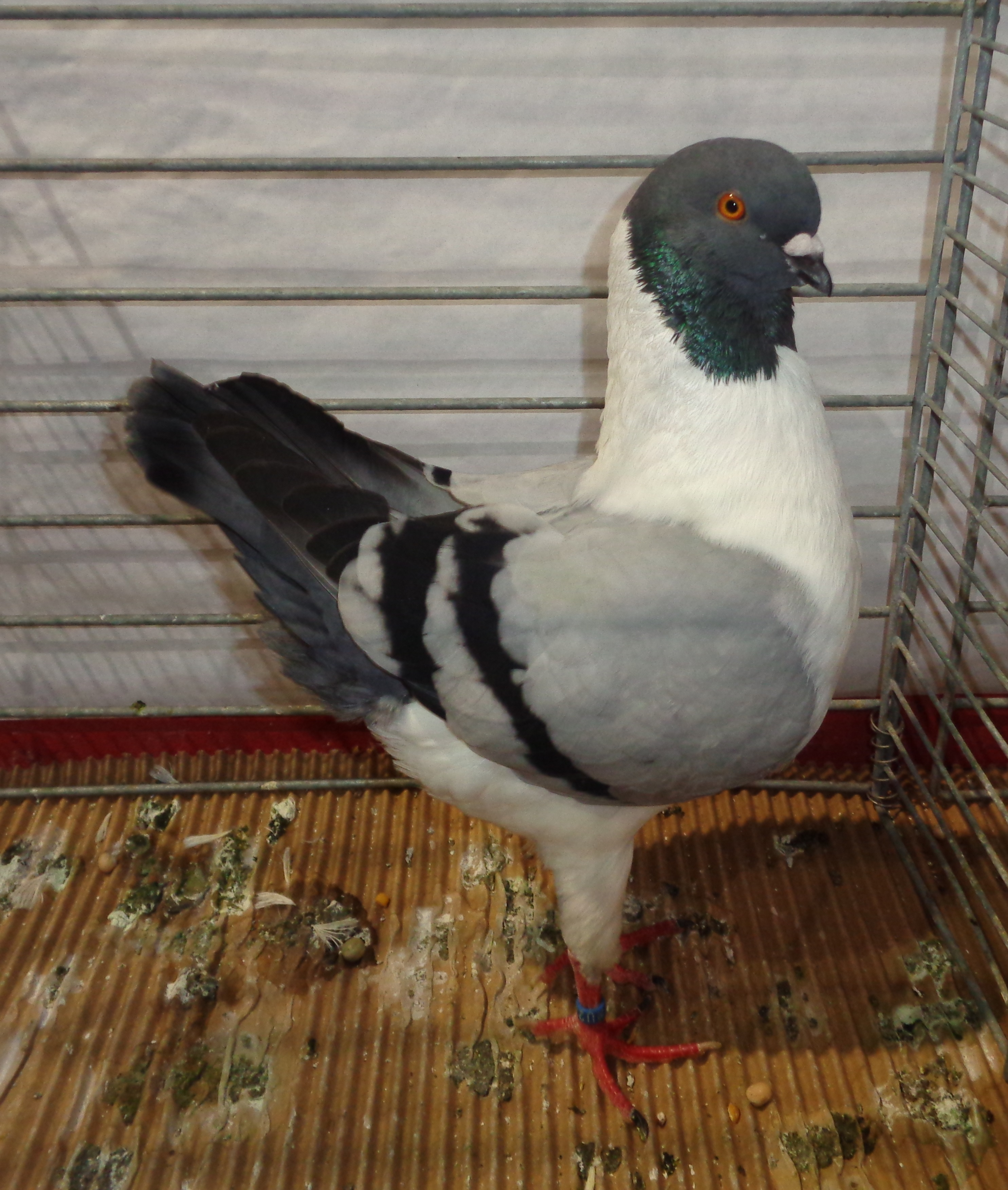
Blue bar Gazzi

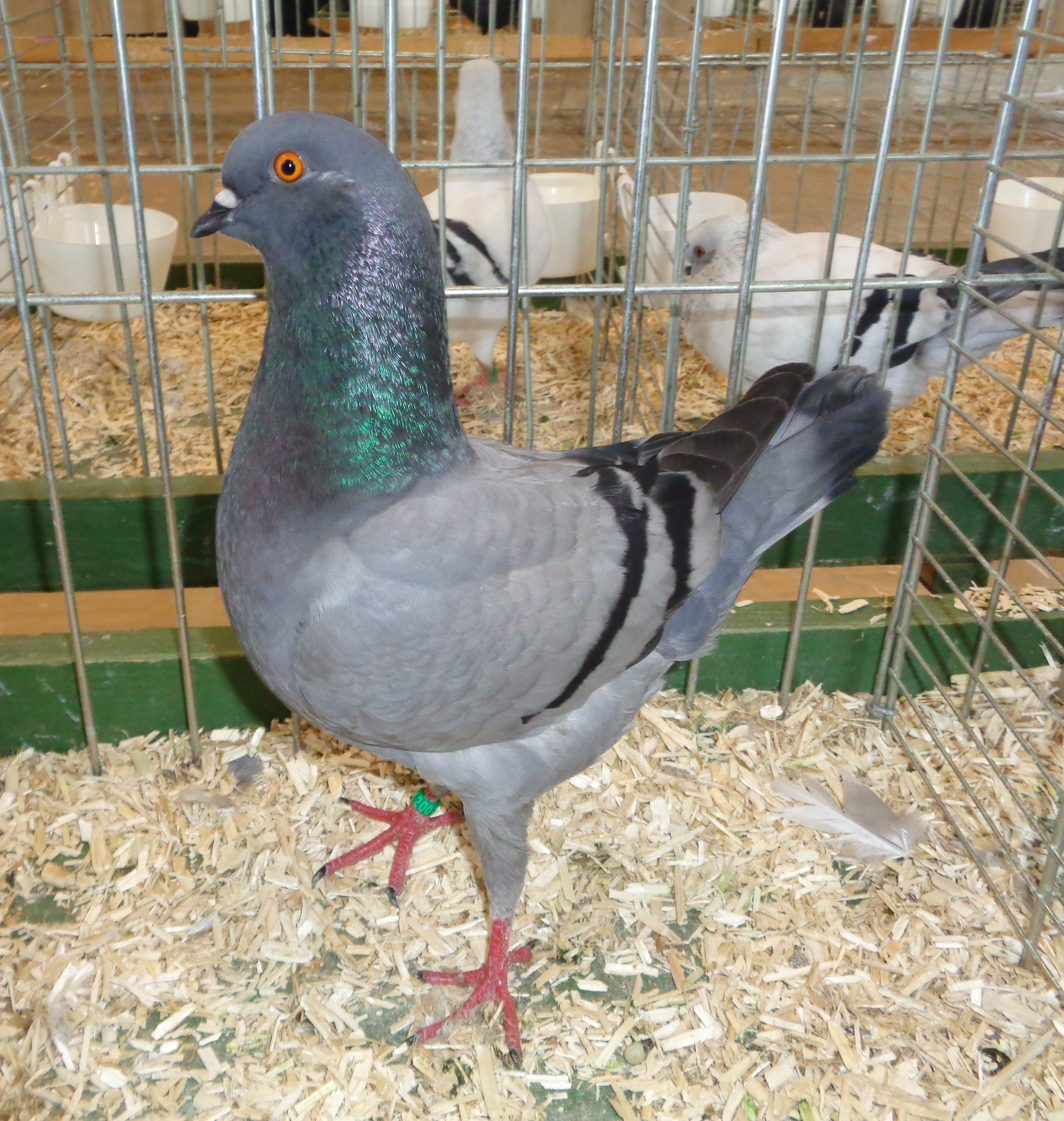
Blue bar Schietti

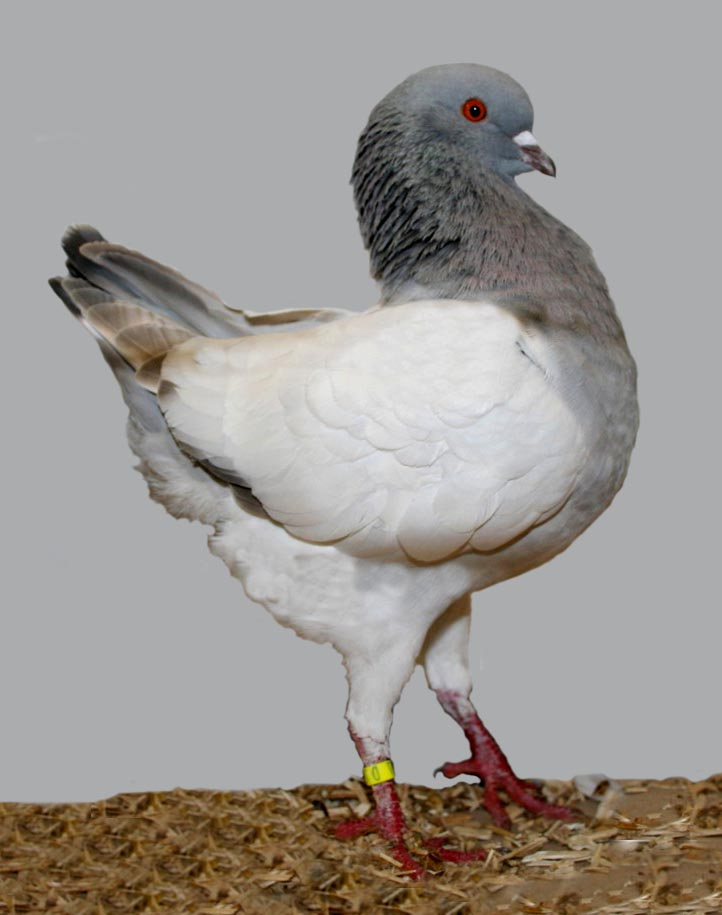
Silver barless Schietti

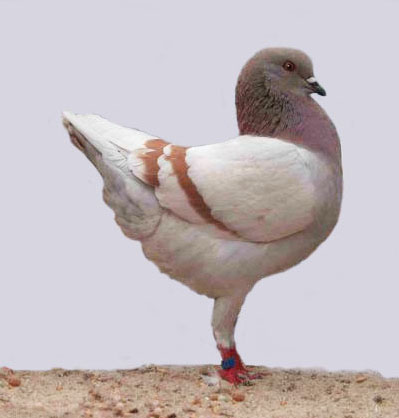
Red bar Schietti

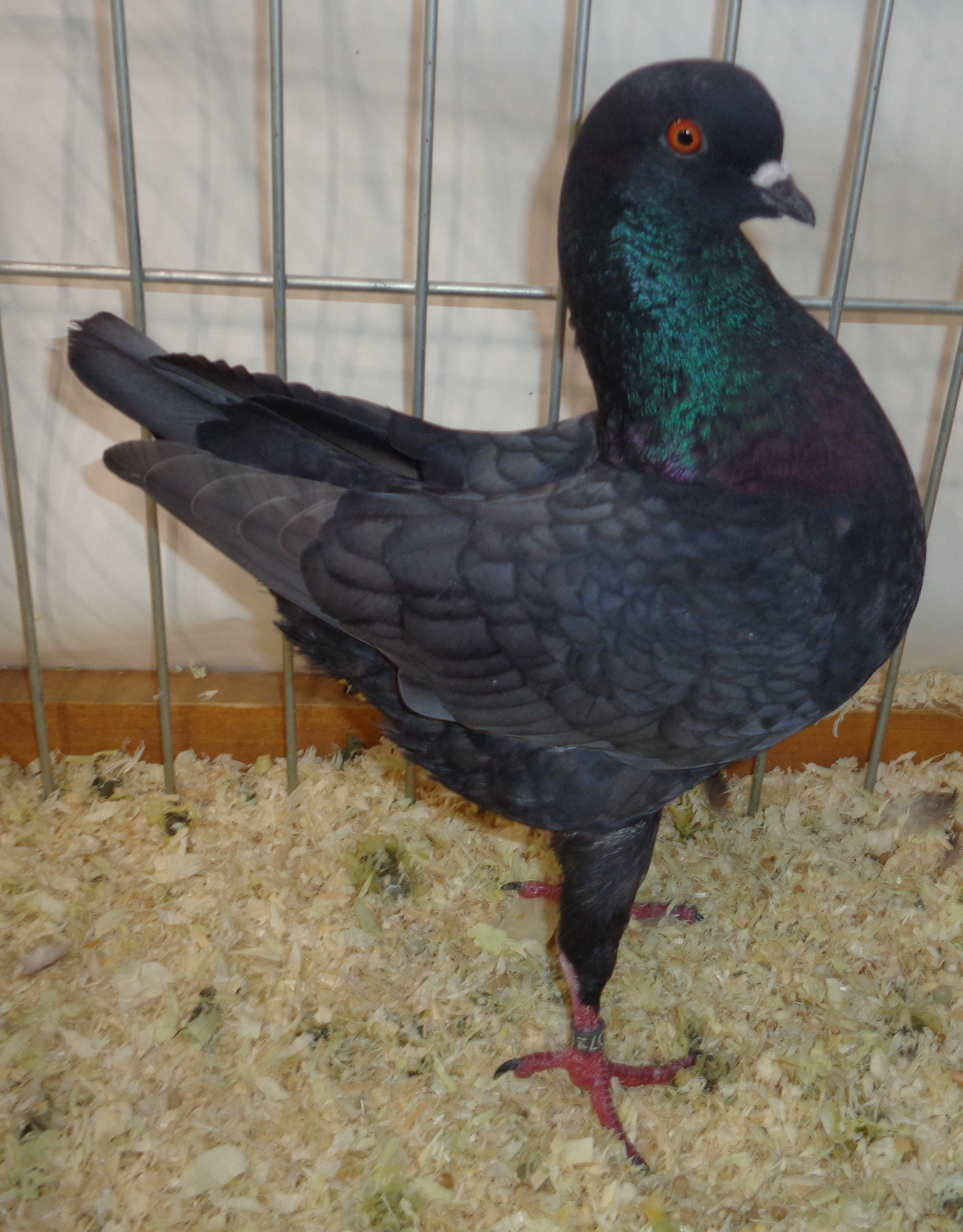
Black Schietti

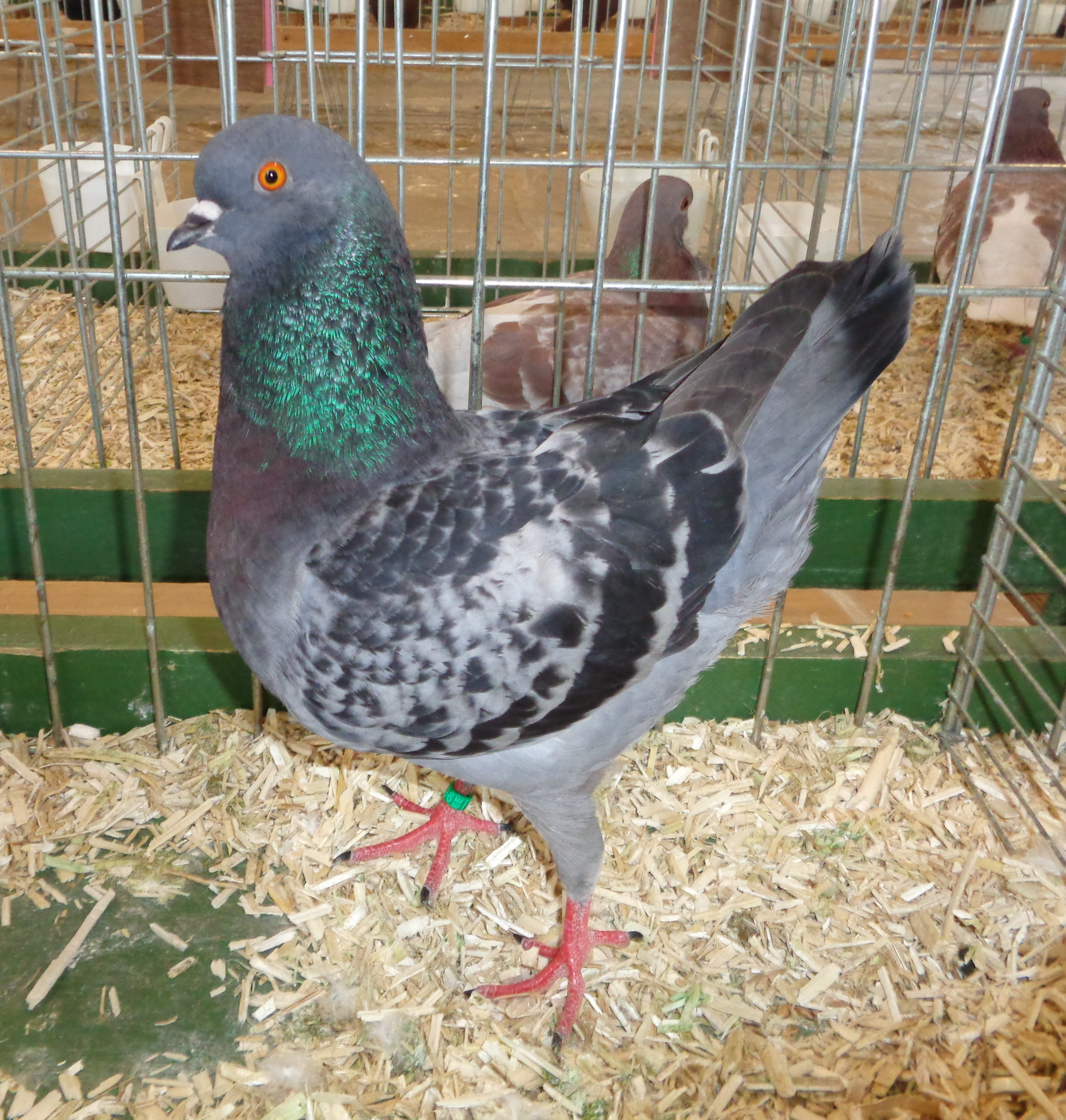
Blue check Schietti

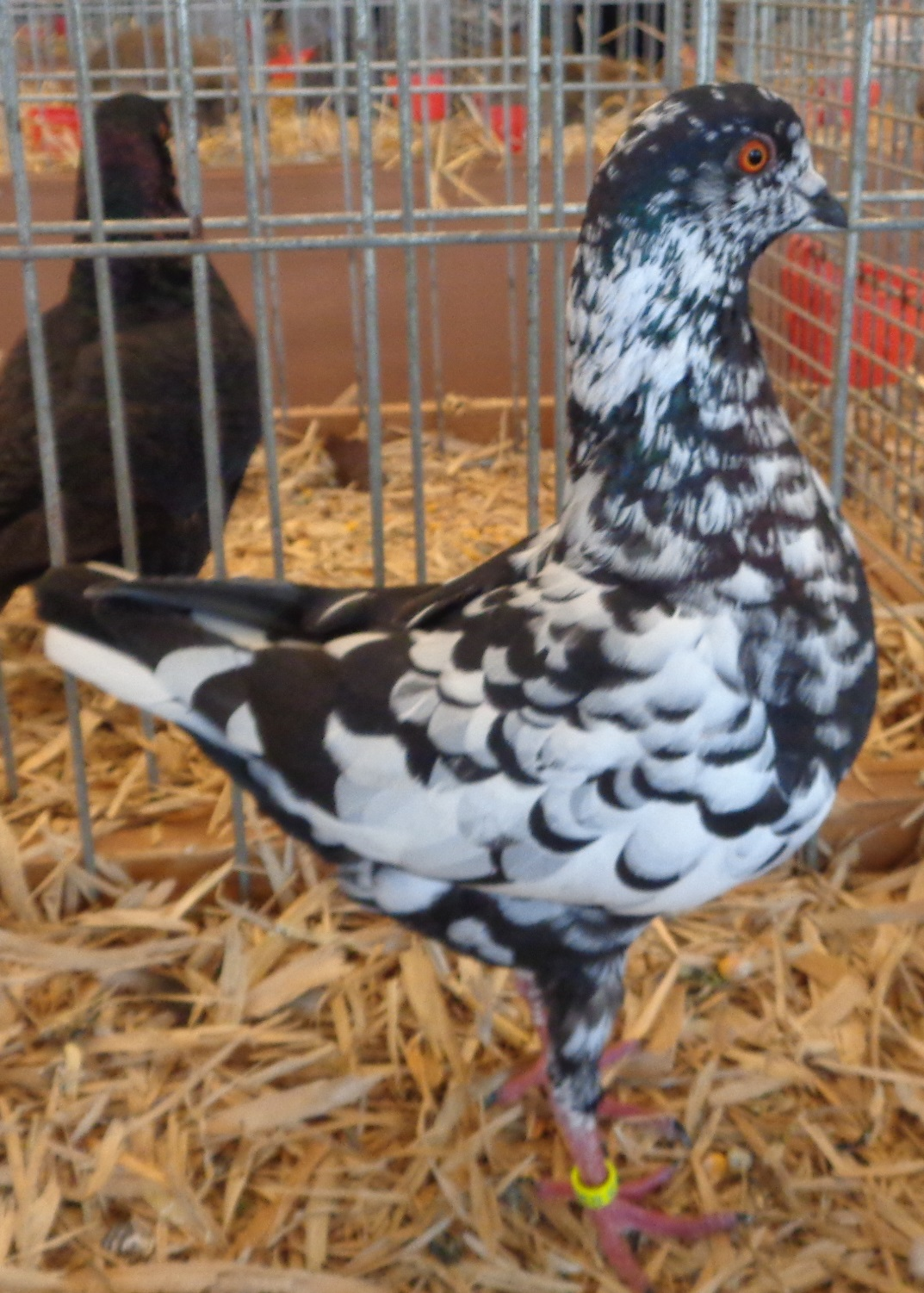
Tigered Schietti

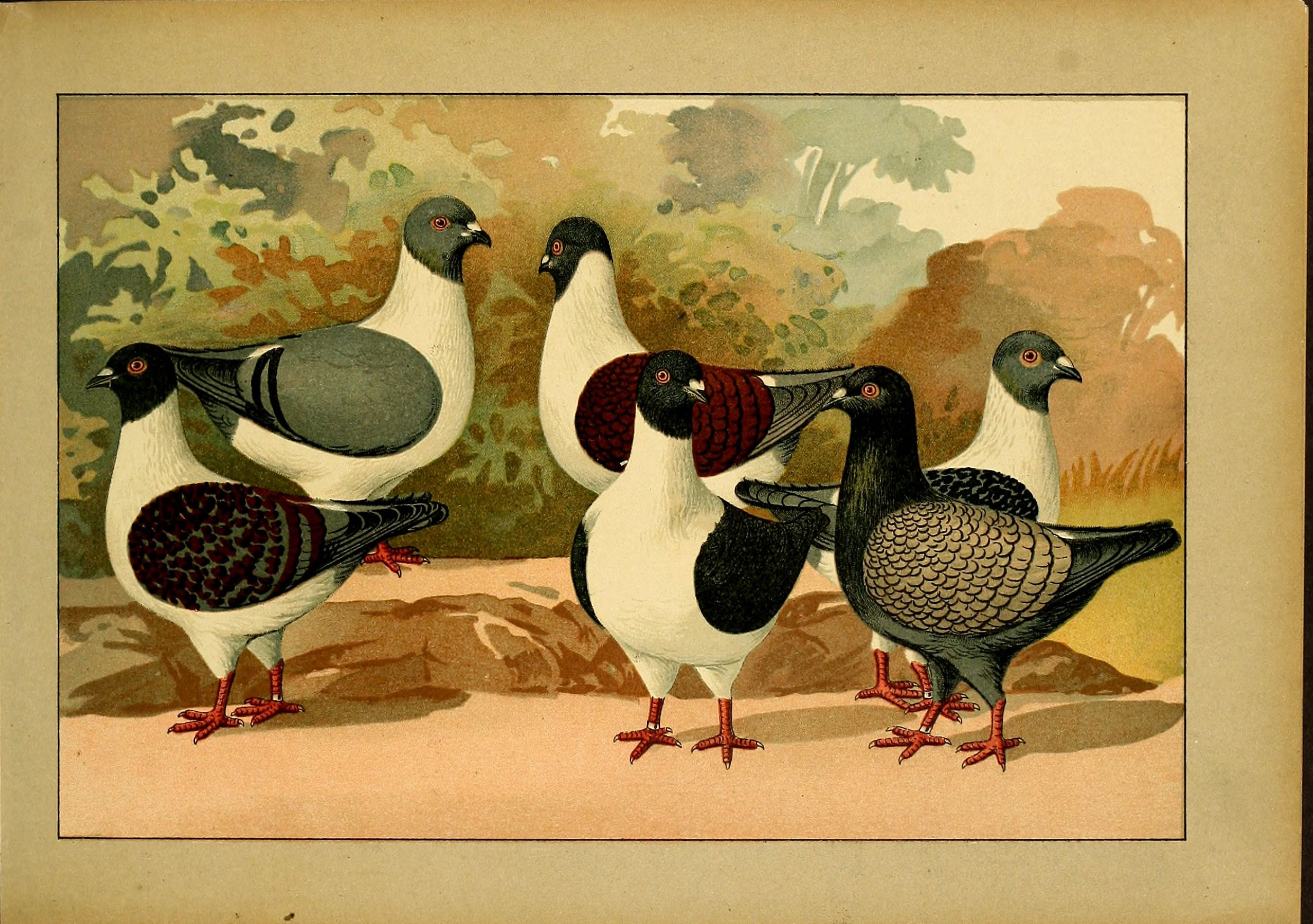
Schachtzabel 1906 Tafel 21

== See also ==
- Pigeon Diet
- Pigeon Housing
- Modena (pigeon)
- List of pigeon breeds
