= Edward L. Anderson =

US Navy officer

Rear Admiral Edward L. Anderson
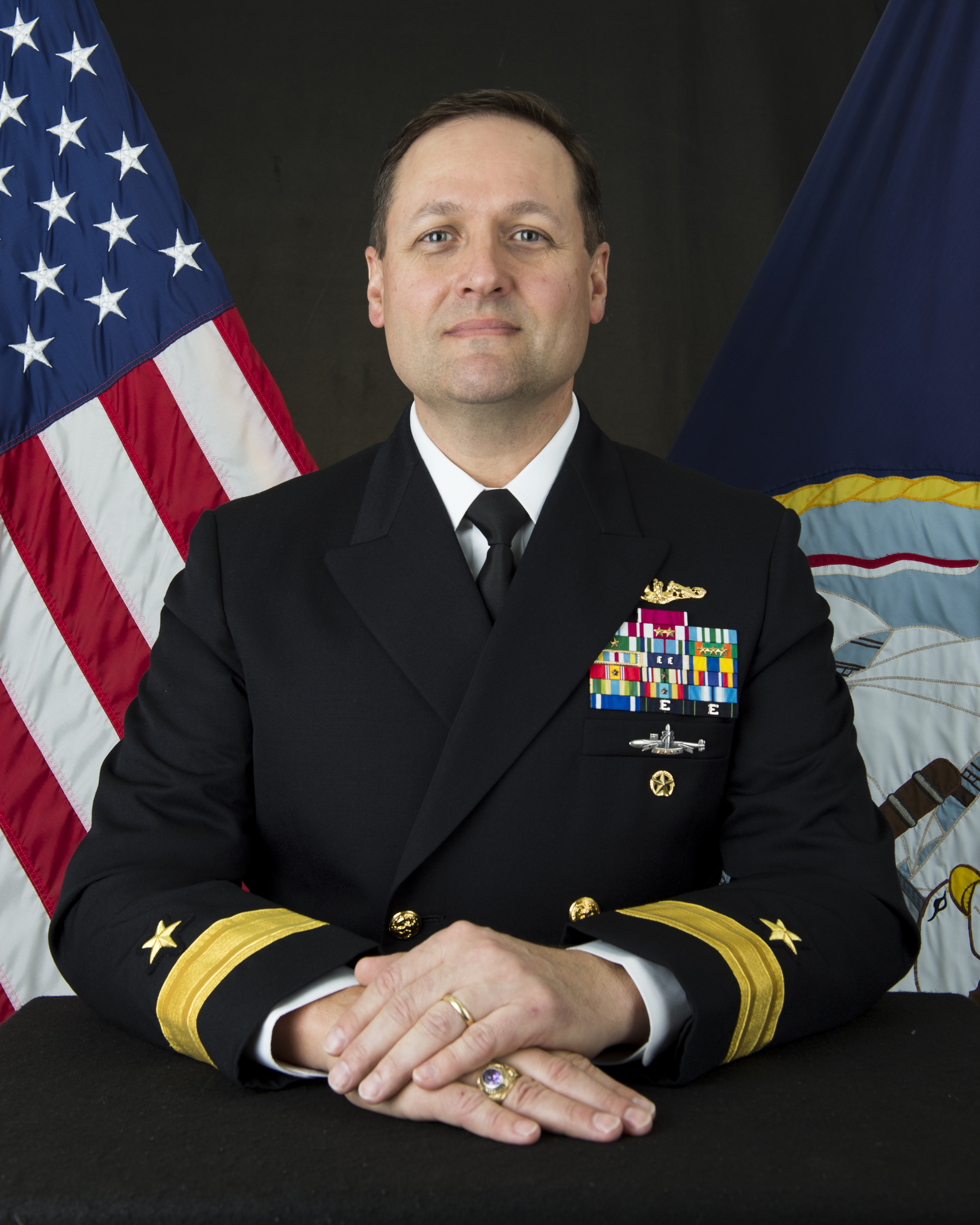
- Rear Admiral Edward L. Anderson, USN, c. 2020
- Education: United States Naval Academy (BS); Indiana University (MBA)
- Military career
- Allegiance: United States of America
- Branch: United States Navy
- Service years: 1990-2022
- Rank: Rear admiral (lower half)
- Commands: Undersea Warfare; USS Jefferson City (SSN 759)
- Awards: Legion of Merit; Defense Meritorious Service Medal; Meritorious Service Medal (3); Joint Commendation Medal; Navy and Marine Corps Commendation Medal (2); Joint Service Achievement Medal; Navy and Marine Corps Achievement Medal (4)

Rear Admiral Edward L. Anderson is a retired United States Navy officer and career submariner who last served as Commander, Undersea Warfare from June 2019 - June 2022

== Life and career ==
Anderson is a native of Glendora, California, and is a 1990 graduate of the United States Naval Academy with a Bachelor of Science in Systems Engineering. He also has as a Master of Business Administration with honors from Kelley School of Business at Indiana University and is a graduate of the Aspen Institute seminar on Global Leadership.

Anderson's sea tours include division officer, USS Newport News (SSN 750); strategic weapons officer, USS Ohio (SSBN 726) (Blue); and executive officer, USS Jefferson City (SSN 759). Four years after departing his executive officer tour, Anderson assumed command of Jefferson City in July 2008. He also is qualified for command in UK submarines following completion of "Perisher" in October 2007.

Anderson has served as space control officer in Cheyenne Mountain, U.S. Space Command; submarine operations officer, Commander, Allied Naval Forces Southern Europe, Naples, Italy; submarine operations and anti-submarine warfare training officer, Commander, Strike Force Training Pacific; deputy director, Navy Programs and Congressional liaison, Undersea Warfare and Strategic Programs, Navy's Office of Legislative Affairs; assistant program manager, Common Submarine Radio Room; Major program manager, Undersea Integration (PMW 770). Anderson was selected for flag officer in March 2017 and was then selected to serve as deputy commander, Fleet Readiness director, Space and Naval Warfare Systems Command in May 2017. Following this tour, he served as NAVSEA deputy commander for Undersea Warfare from June 2019 to Sep 2021. On October 1, 2021 he assumed the role as initial program executive officer for Undersea Warfare Systems (PEO UWS).
