= Wayne L. Winston =

American academic (born 1950)

Wayne Leslie Winston (born February 14, 1950, in New Jersey) is an American academic who serves as Professor Emeritus of Decision and Information Systems at the Kelley School of Business at Indiana University.

== Education ==
Winston has a master's degree in mathematics from the Massachusetts Institute of Technology (1971) and a PhD in Operations Research from Yale University (1975). In 1986 he created the computer game Hoops with Jeff Sagarin.

== Career ==
Winston has worked for Microsoft Corporation, Cisco Systems, 3M Company, Deloitte, the Dallas Mavericks, the US Department of Defense and the US Army. He is a Professor Emeritus of Decision and Information Systems at the Kelley School and a visiting professor at the University of Houston.

Winston's books include Marketing Analytics: Data-Driven Techniques with Microsoft Excel, Business Analytics: Data Analysis & Decision Making with S. Christian Albright, and Microsoft Excel 2016 Data Analysis and Business Modeling, Fifth Edition. His papers include "Optimal Price Skimming by a Monopolist Facing Rational Consumers" published on Management Science, and "Optimality of the shortest line discipline" published by Cambridge University Press. He also created the computer game Hoops with Jeff Sagarin.

== Awards and honors ==
- Lilly Award for Teaching Excellence, 1991, 1992, 1995, 2004
- Two-time winner on the Jeopardy game show, 1992

== Selected publications ==
- Operations research: applications and algorithms, PWS-Kent Pub. Co. (1991)
- S. Christian Albright, Wayne L. Winston, Christopher James Zappe, Managerial Statistics, Duxbury, (2000)
- Financial Models Using Simulation and Optimization: A Step-by-step Guide with Excel and Palisade's DecisionTools Software, Volume 1, Palisade Corporation (2000)
- Mathletics: How Gamblers, Managers, and Sports Enthusiasts Use Mathematics in Baseball, Basketball, and Football, Princeton University Press (2012)
- S. Christian Albright, Wayne L. Winston: Business Analytics: Data Analysis & Decision Making, Cengage Learning (2014)
- Marketing Analytics: Data-Driven Techniques with Microsoft Excel (2014)
- Microsoft Excel 2016 Data Analysis and Business Modeling, Fifth Edition, Microsoft Press (2016)
