= Modena, Wisconsin =

- Town
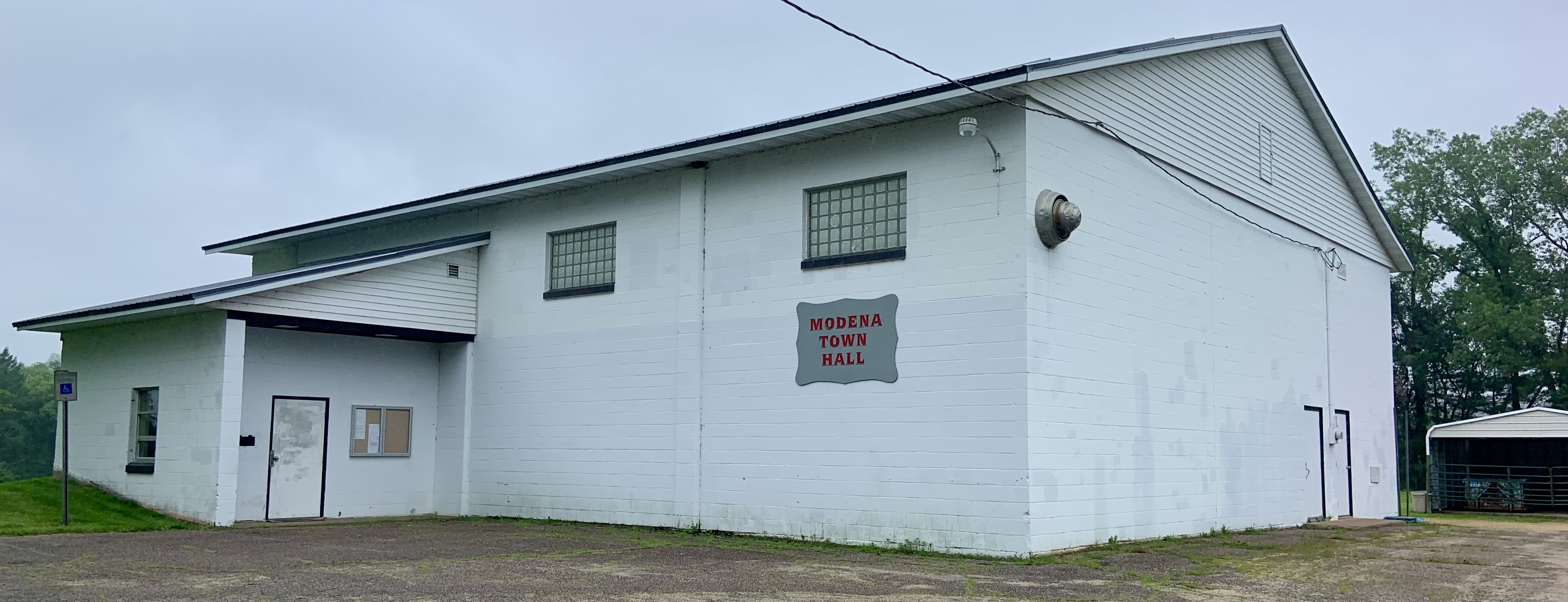
- Town hall

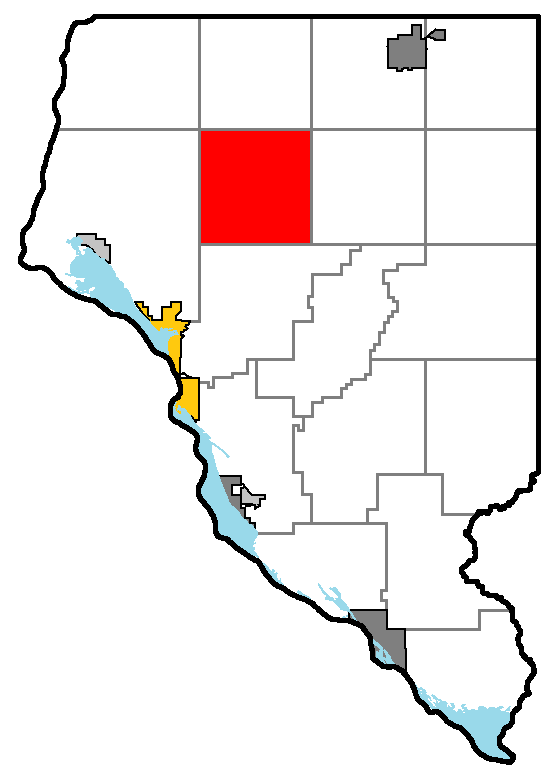
- Location of Modena, Buffalo County

- Location of Buffalo County, Wisconsin
- Coordinates: 44°27′32″N 91°49′29″W
- Country: United States
- State: Wisconsin
- County: Buffalo

Area
  - Total: 36.1 sq mi (93.4 km^{2})
  - Land: 35.9 sq mi (93.0 km^{2})
  - Water: 0.15 sq mi (0.4 km^{2})
- Elevation: 827 ft (252 m)

Population (2020)
  - Total: 313
  - Density: 8.72/sq mi (3.37/km^{2})
- Time zone: UTC-6 (Central (CST))
  - Summer (DST): UTC-5 (CDT)
- FIPS code: 55-53450
- GNIS feature ID: 1583733

Modena (/moʊˈdiːnə/ moh-DEE-nə) is a town in Buffalo County in the U.S. state of Wisconsin. The population was 313 at the 2020 census. The unincorporated community of Urne is also located partially in the town.

== Geography ==
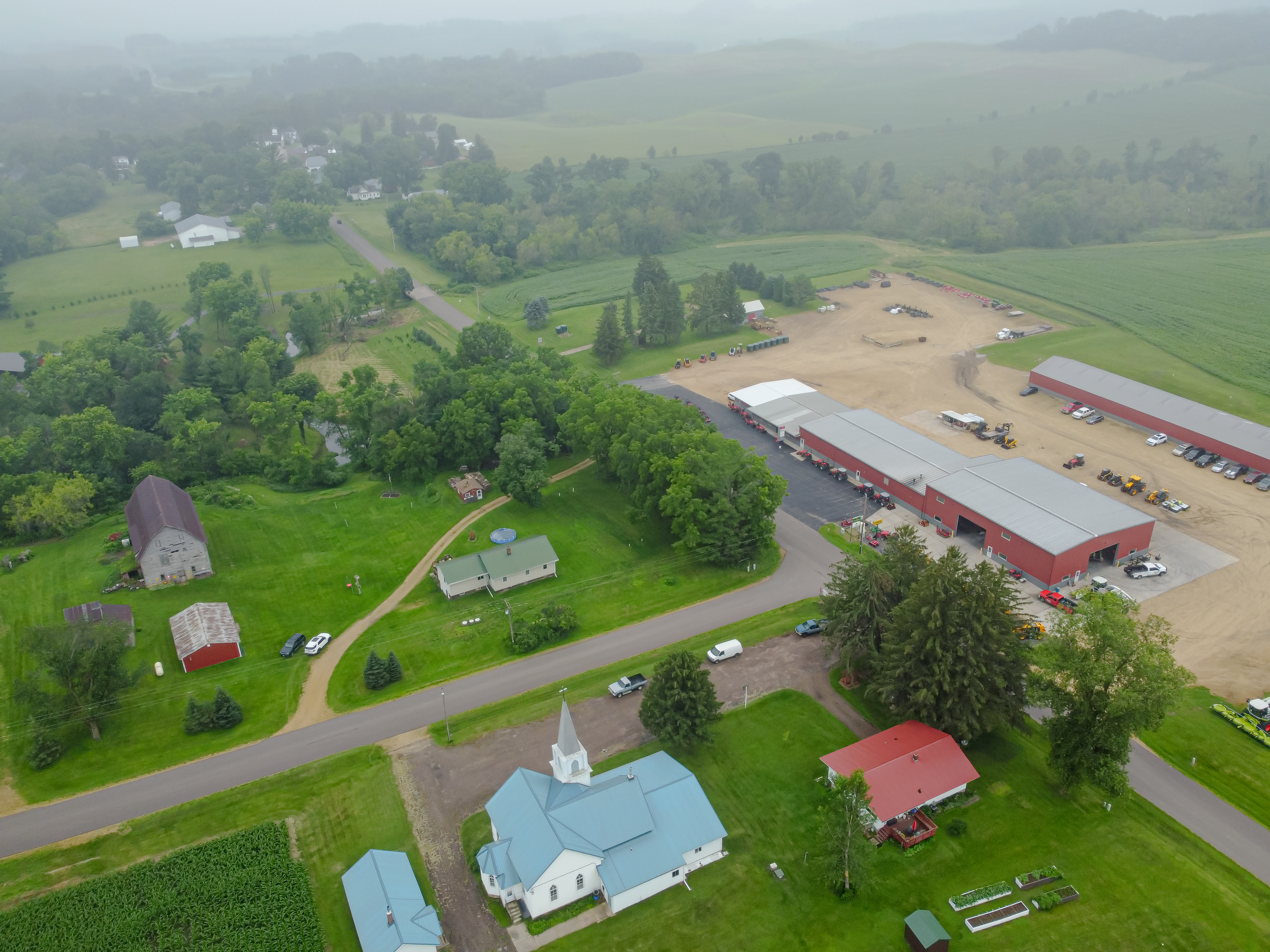

According to the United States Census Bureau, the town has a total area of 36.1 square miles (93.4 km^{2}), of which 35.9 square miles (93.0 km^{2}) is land and 0.15 square miles (0.4 km^{2}), or 0.47%, is water.

== Demographics ==
As of the census of 2000, there were 318 people, 134 households, and 90 families residing in the town. The population density was 8.8 people per square mile (3.4/km^{2}). There were 155 housing units at an average density of 4.3 per square mile (1.7/km^{2}). The racial makeup of the town was 99.69% White and 0.31% African American. Hispanic or Latino of any race were 0.31% of the population.

There were 134 households, out of which 28.4% had children under the age of 18 living with them, 59.0% were married couples living together, 6.0% had a female householder with no husband present, and 32.8% were non-families. 28.4% of all households were made up of individuals, and 10.4% had someone living alone who was 65 years of age or older. The average household size was 2.37 and the average family size was 2.96.

In the town, the population was spread out, with 23.9% under the age of 18, 6.3% from 18 to 24, 28.0% from 25 to 44, 27.0% from 45 to 64, and 14.8% who were 65 years of age or older. The median age was 41 years. For every 100 females, there were 106.5 males. For every 100 females age 18 and over, there were 110.4 males.

The median income for a household in the town was $35,000, and the median income for a family was $45,893. Males had a median income of $27,303 versus $23,750 for females. The per capita income for the town was $16,142. About 5.0% of families and 5.0% of the population were below the poverty line, including 2.2% of those under age 18 and 12.7% of those age 65 or over.

== Notable people ==
- Orlando Brown, farmer and legislator
- Schuyler F. Otteson, educator
