= Indiana Business Research Center =

The Indiana Business Research Center (IBRC), established in 1925, is a research unit in the Kelley School of Business at Indiana University. The IBRC provides and interprets economic information for the state's business, government and nonprofit organizations, as well as users of such information throughout the nation.

The IBRC maintains databases on topics such as income, employment, taxes, industry sectors, education, and demographics, as well as other economic indicators for the nation, the state and local areas. The center conducts original research to generate information when existing data are not available or sufficient.

== STATS Indiana ==
STATS Indiana is the statistical data utility for the State of Indiana, developed and maintained since 1985 by the Indiana Business Research Center at Indiana University's Kelley School of Business. It is the center's main data hub for economic, demographic and social data and is available to the public.

== Recent initiatives ==
- The Innovation 2.0 project provides insight into the innovation capacity and innovative output of a region, expanding on the prior Innovation Index.

== Published studies ==
The IBRC has published numerous studies. The most recent list of studies is on the IBRC reports page.

== Publications ==
- InContext: A bi-monthly publication that provides articles about Indiana's workforce and economy for a general audience.
- Indiana Business Review: Published continuously since 1926, the IBR provides analysis on economic and demographic issues.

== Awards ==
=== InContext ===
- AUBER 2009 Publication Award
- AUBER 2006 Publication Award
- AUBER 2003 Publication Award
- NASDA 2001 Publication Award
- LMI 2000 Publication Award

=== Indiana Business Review ===
- AUBER 2009 Economic Outlook Publication Award

=== STATS Indiana ===
- AUBER 2009 Award for Excellence

== List of directors ==
- Jerry Conover, 2003-current
- Morton Marcus, 1970–2003

== See also ==
- Indiana University
- Kelley School of Business
