= Modena pigeon =

Breed of pigeon

Modena
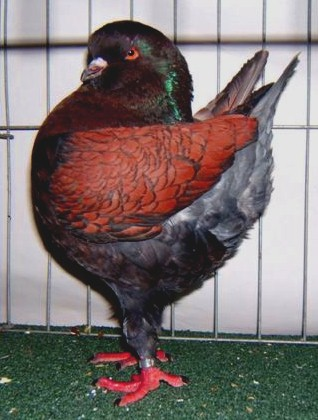
- Bronze Schietti
- Conservation status: Common
- Country of origin: Italy

Classification
- Australian Breed Group: Group 4 Homers & Hens
- US Breed Group: Fancy
- EE Breed Group: Hen Pigeons

Notes
- Originally a flying breed now bred solely for exhibition.

The Modena is a breed of fancy pigeon developed over many years of selective breeding. Modenas along with other varieties of domesticated pigeons are all descendants of the rock dove (Columba livia).

== Description ==
The breed comes in many different colors in two main varieties, Gazzi and Schietti. Gazzi is a pied marking with the head and portion of the throat, the wings and the tail colored and the rest of the bird being white. Schiettis are non-pied. It is a very popular breed of pigeon. The American Pigeon Journal devoted an entire issue to it in June 1957 and again in April/May 1962

== Origin ==
The breed is of Italian origin and derives its name from the city of Modena where it was first bred centuries ago.

== Gallery ==
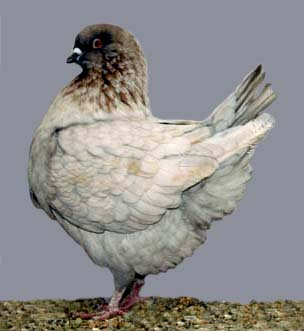

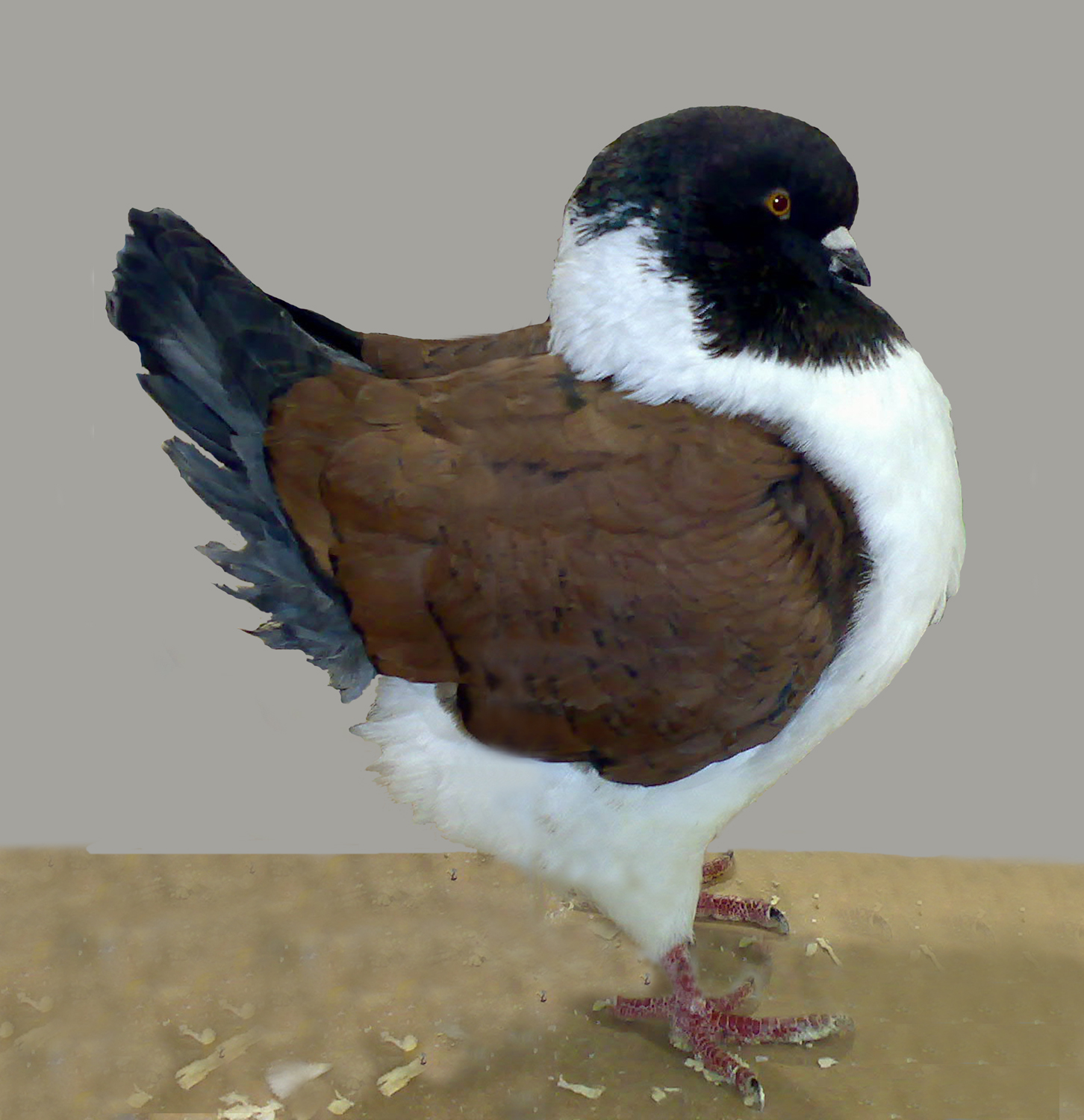

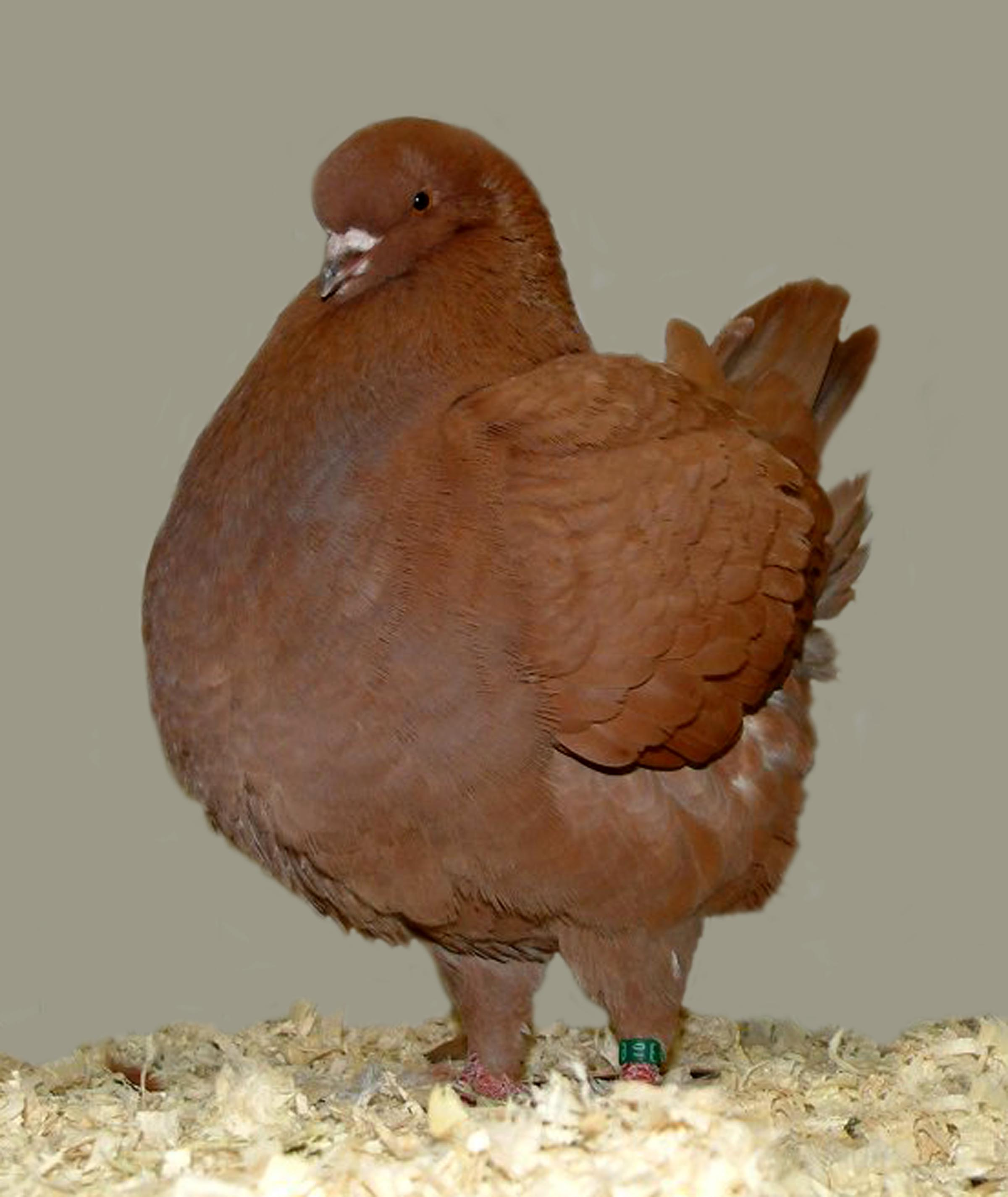

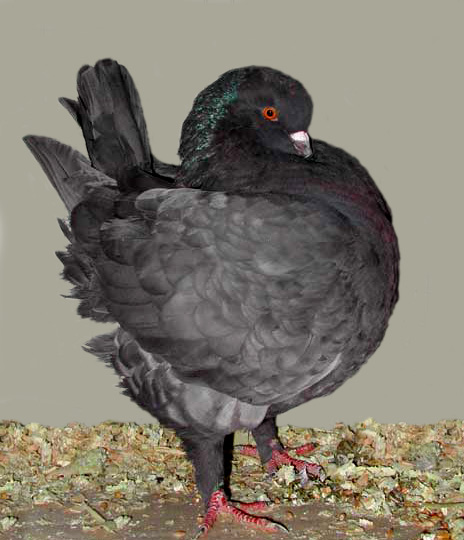

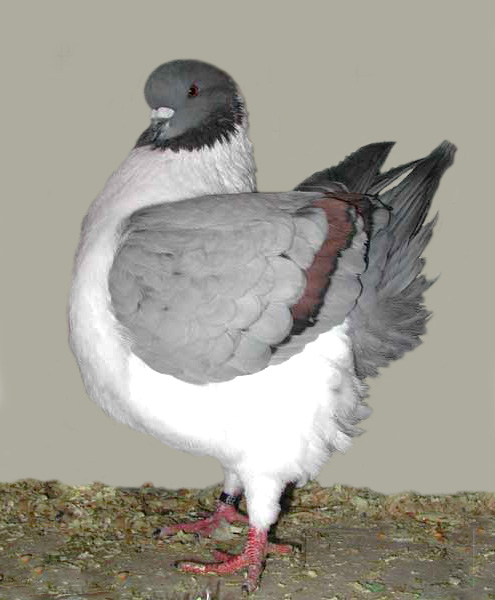

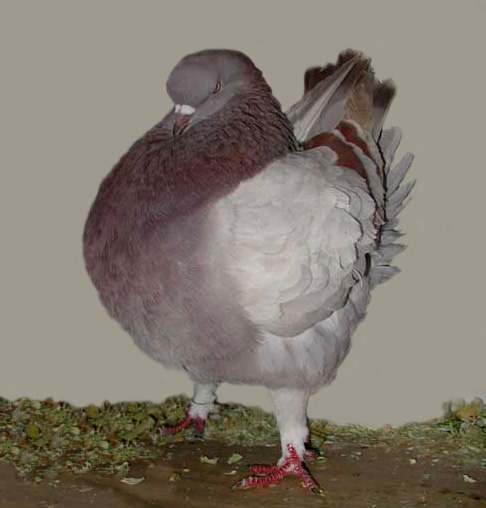

== See also ==
- German Modena
- List of pigeon breeds
