= Nelson, Wisconsin =

- Village
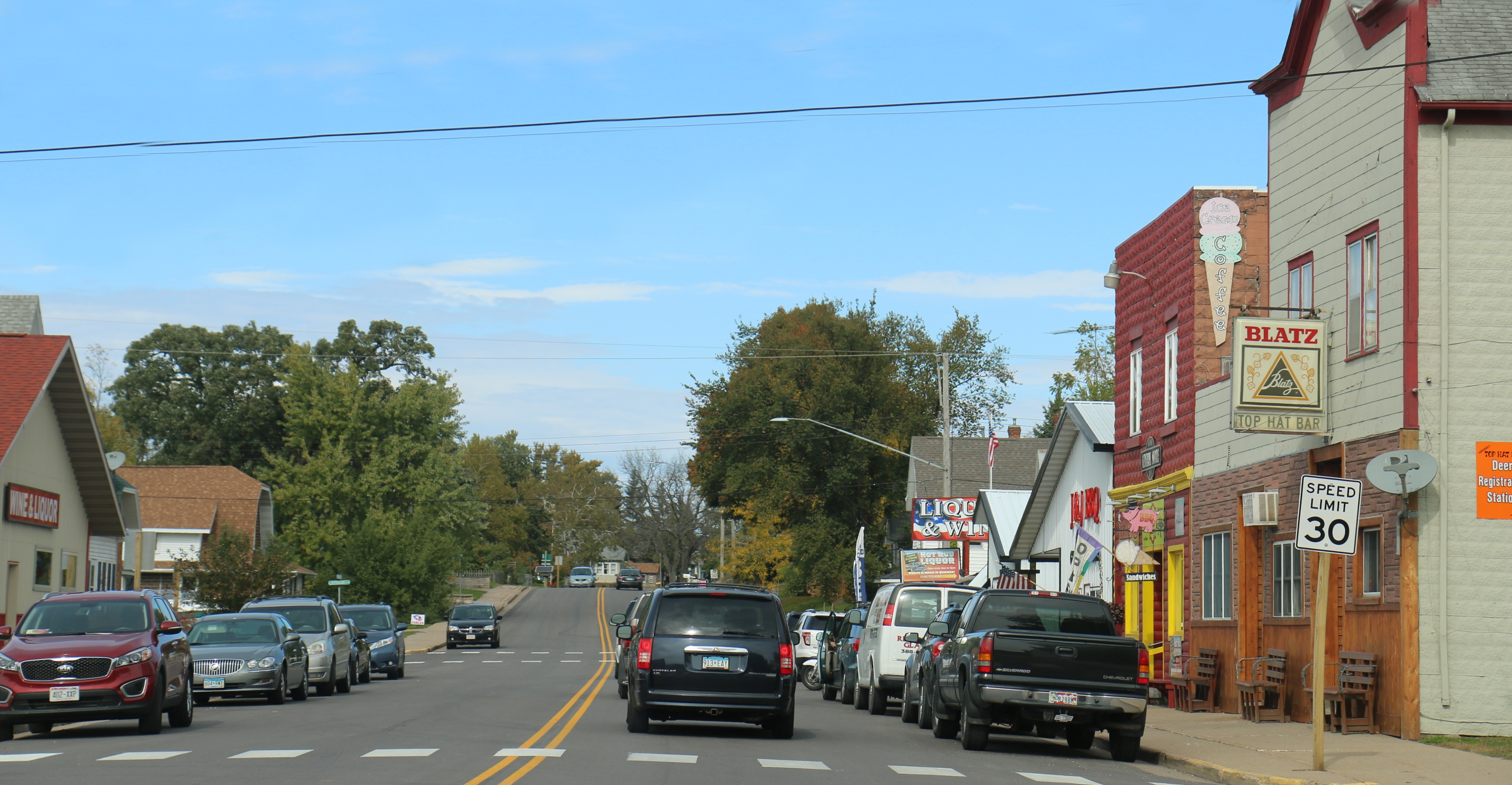
- Downtown Nelson

- Location of Nelson in Buffalo County, Wisconsin.
- Coordinates: 44°27′25″N 91°58′26″W
- Country: United States
- State: Wisconsin
- County: Buffalo

Area
  - Total: 1.46 sq mi (3.77 km^{2})
  - Land: 1.36 sq mi (3.51 km^{2})
  - Water: 0.10 sq mi (0.26 km^{2})
- Elevation: 827 ft (252 m)

Population (2020)
  - Total: 322
  - Density: 238/sq mi (91.7/km^{2})
- Time zone: UTC-6 (Central (CST))
  - Summer (DST): UTC-5 (CDT)
- Area codes: 715 & 534
- FIPS code: 55-55975
- GNIS feature ID: 1570152
- Website: https://www.villageofnelson.org/

Nelson is a village in Buffalo County in the U.S. state of Wisconsin. The population was 322 at the 2020 census. The village is surrounded by the Town of Nelson.

Nelson is located at the junction of the Mississippi River and Chippewa River valleys. The river bottoms surrounding the confluence are home to a large amount of wildlife. A causeway and bridge across the Mississippi River link Nelson with the city of Wabasha, Minnesota at the junction of Wisconsin Highway 25 and Wisconsin Highway 35. Southbound Highway 25 becomes Minnesota Highway 60 upon crossing the Mississippi River to Wabasha.

Nelson lies on Wisconsin Highway 35, the "Great River Road," a popular tourist route that runs along the east bank of the Mississippi River. The village's primary destination for tourists is the 100-year-old Nelson Cheese Factory.

== Geography ==
Nelson is located at 44°25′22″N 92°0′20″W (44.422799, -92.005812).

According to the United States Census Bureau, the village has a total area of 1.44 square miles (3.73 km^{2}), of which 1.33 square miles (3.44 km^{2}) is land and 0.11 square miles (0.28 km^{2}) is water.

== Demographics ==
Historical population
Census	Pop.	Note	%±
1980	389		—
1990	388		−0.3%
2000	395		1.8%
2010	374		−5.3%
2020	322		−13.9%
U.S. Decennial Census

=== 2010 census ===
As of the census of 2010, there were 374 people, 172 households, and 101 families residing in the village. The population density was 281.2 inhabitants per square mile (108.6/km^{2}). There were 204 housing units at an average density of 153.4 per square mile (59.2/km^{2}). The racial makeup of the village was 98.7% White and 1.3% from two or more races. Hispanic or Latino of any race were 1.3% of the population.

There were 172 households, of which 23.8% had children under the age of 18 living with them, 45.3% were married couples living together, 7.6% had a female householder with no husband present, 5.8% had a male householder with no wife present, and 41.3% were non-families. 34.9% of all households were made up of individuals, and 19.2% had someone living alone who was 65 years of age or older. The average household size was 2.17 and the average family size was 2.77.

The median age in the village was 44.4 years. 19.5% of residents were under the age of 18; 9.1% were between the ages of 18 and 24; 22.2% were from 25 to 44; 28.1% were from 45 to 64; and 21.1% were 65 years of age or older. The gender makeup of the village was 54.5% male and 45.5% female.

=== 2000 census ===
As of the census of 2000, there were 395 people, 181 households, and 97 families residing in the village. The population density was 270.0 people per square mile (104.5/km^{2}). There were 201 housing units at an average density of 137.4 per square mile (53.2/km^{2}). The racial makeup of the village was 99.24% White, 0.25% Native American and 0.51% Asian. 0.25% of the population were Hispanic or Latino of any race.

There were 181 households, out of which 26.0% had children under the age of 18 living with them, 45.3% were married couples living together, 7.2% had a female householder with no husband present, and 45.9% were non-families. 38.7% of all households were made up of individuals, and 17.7% had someone living alone who was 65 years of age or older. The average household size was 2.18 and the average family size was 2.98.

In the village, the population was spread out, with 23.8% under the age of 18, 7.6% from 18 to 24, 26.8% from 25 to 44, 24.6% from 45 to 64, and 17.2% who were 65 years of age or older. The median age was 39 years. For every 100 females, there were 104.7 males. For every 100 females age 18 and over, there were 100.7 males.

The median income for a household in the village was $30,833, and the median income for a family was $37,917. Males had a median income of $31,375 versus $20,000 for females. The per capita income for the village was $14,958. About 6.1% of families and 11.3% of the population were below the poverty line, including 9.7% of those under age 18 and 15.4% of those age 65 or over.

== Images ==
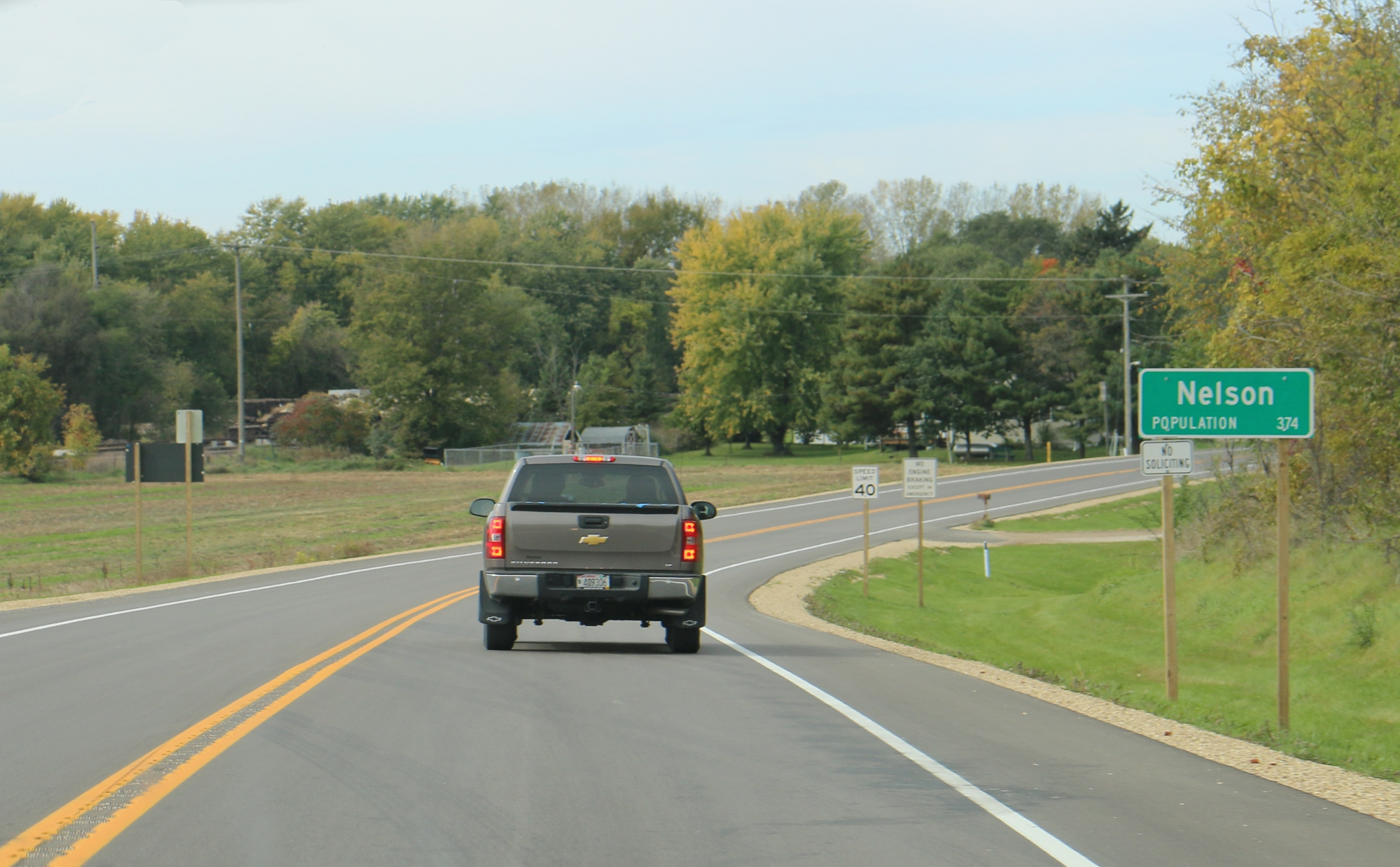
The sign for Nelson on WIS35

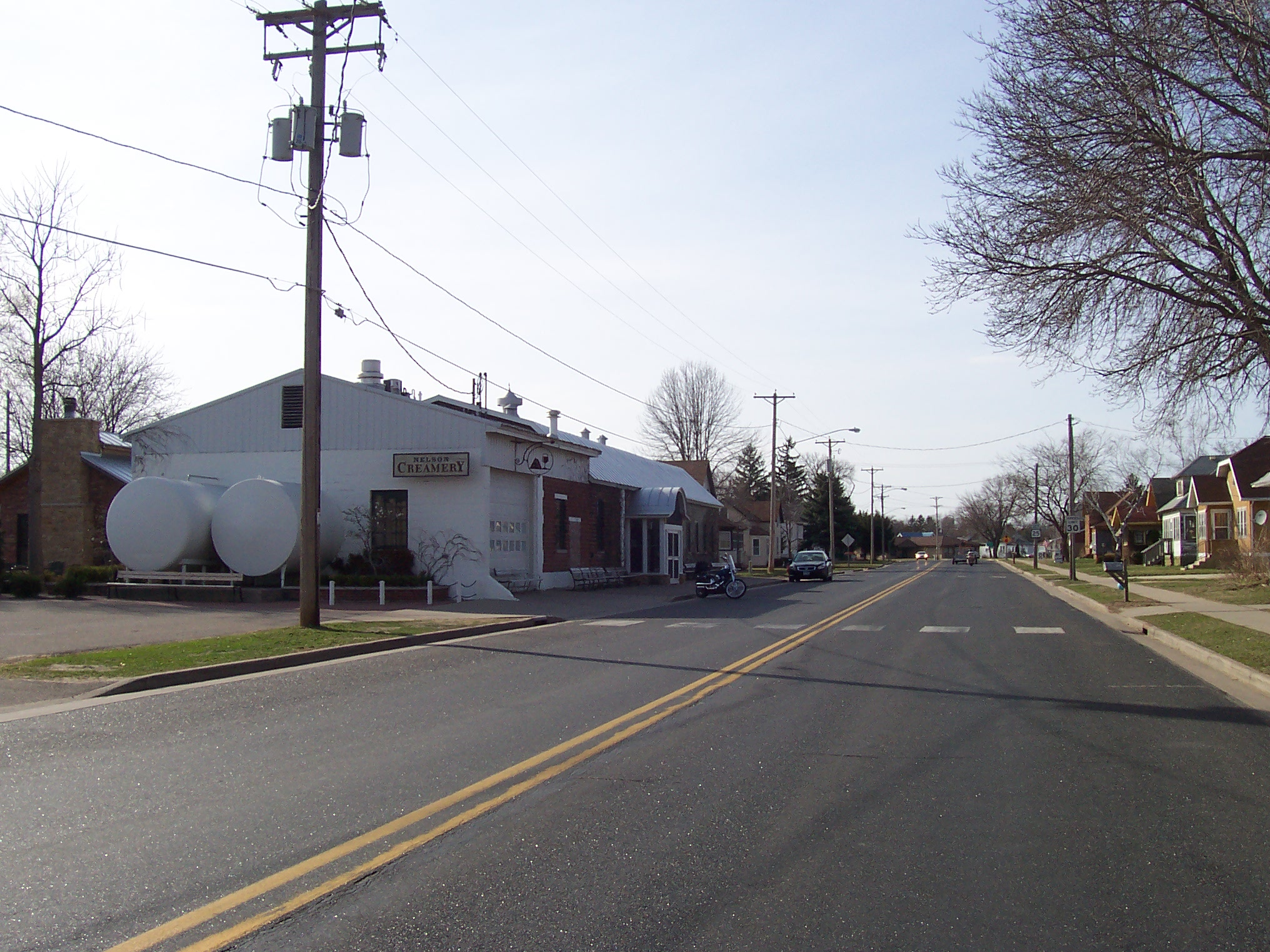
Street view of Nelson

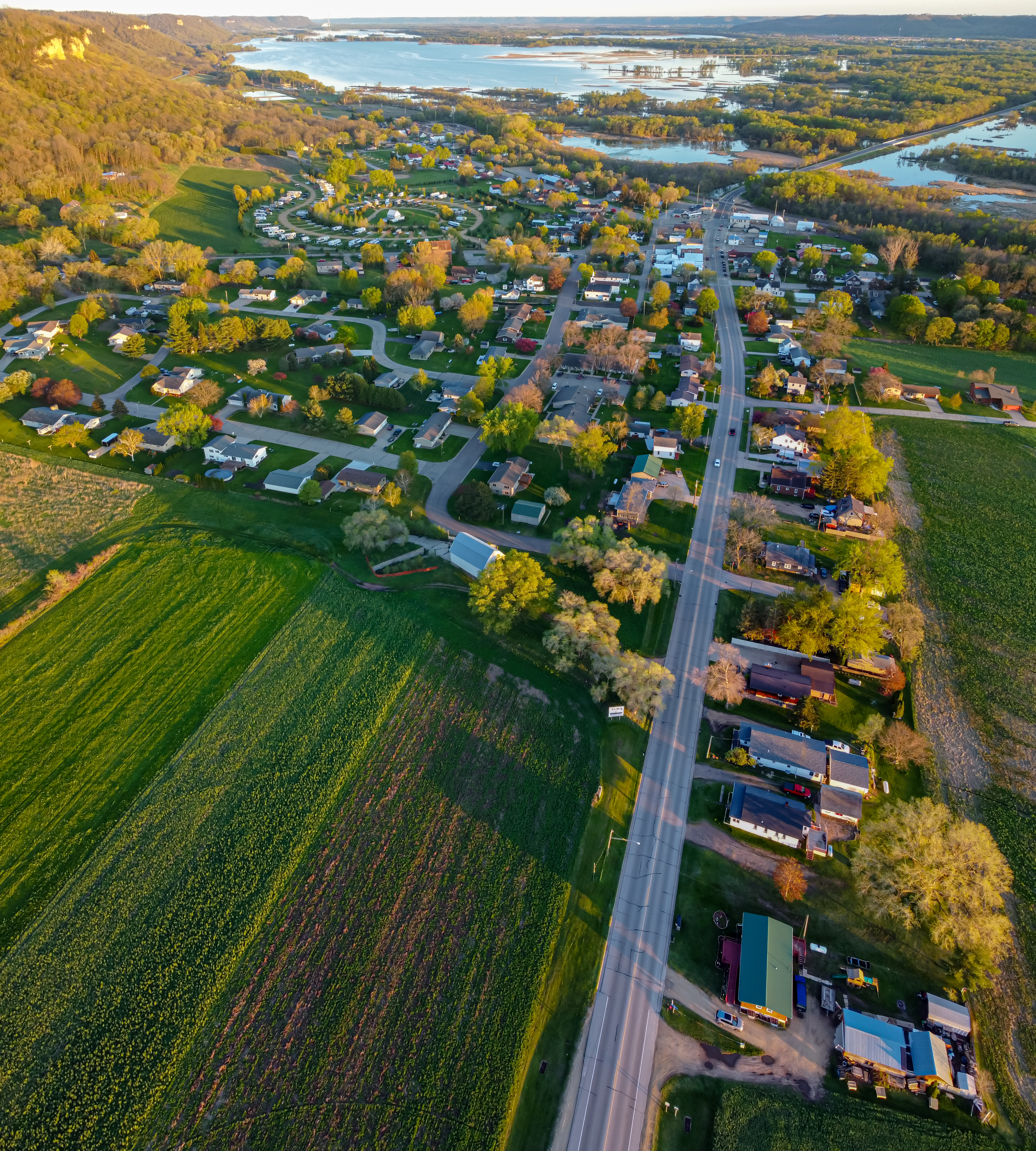
