= Kelley School of Business =

Business school in Indiana, US

Coordinates: 39.17218°N 86.51843°W

Indiana University Kelley School of Business
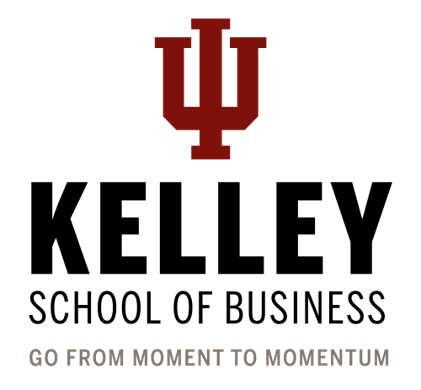
- Motto: Go from Moment to Momentum
- Type: Public business school
- Established: 1920; 106 years ago
- Parent institution: Indiana University Bloomington
- Accreditation: AACSB International
- Affiliations: Consortium for Graduate Study in Management; The Washington Campus
- Endowment: US$107 million (2016)
- Dean: Patrick E. Hopkins
- Students: 13,538 (Bloomington, 2022); 1,596 (Indianapolis, 2022)
- Undergraduates: 10,185 (Bloomington, 2022); 1,284 (Indianapolis, 2022)
- Postgraduates: 2,123 (Bloomington, 2016); 541 (Indianapolis, 2016)
- Location: Bloomington & Indianapolis, Indiana, U.S.
- Campus: Urban
- Alumni: 133,000+
- Website: kelley.iu.edu

The Kelley School of Business (KSB) is an undergraduate and graduate business school for Indiana University Bloomington and Indiana University Indianapolis. (Note: IU’s Kelley School of Business operates as one school on two campuses: Bloomington and Indianapolis. Indiana University Bloomington and Indiana University Indianapolis are core campuses of the Indiana University system.) As of 2022, approximately 13,538 full-time undergraduate and graduate students are enrolled on its Bloomington campus, as well as 1,596 students at the Indianapolis campus. In addition, more than 800 students study for graduate degrees through the school's online MBA and MS programs as part of "Kelley Direct".

As of 2025, Kelley School of Business has more than 133,000 alumni worldwide across 105 countries and five continents.

== History ==
In March 1902, the university trustees decided to establish a commercial course within the Department of Economics and Social Science starting the next school year, replacing the last two years of the regular university course. Upon completion of the new curriculum, a special certificate in addition to the ordinary diploma would be granted.

A separate school was established as "School of Commerce and Finance" of Indiana University in 1920 with 70 students enrolled. It was subsequently renamed "School of Business Administration" in 1933 and "School of Business" in 1938. In 1997, it was renamed "Kelley School of Business" after alumnus E.W. Kelley, chairman of the Steak 'n Shake Company, who had given a donation of $23 million. Initially, it was housed in the Commerce Building constructed in 1923 (William A. Rawles Hall since 1971), moving to the Business and Economics Building in 1940 (called Woodburn Hall since 1971), and finally to today's Business School building in 1966.

The first graduate degree offered by the school was the Master of Science in Business which was approved in 1935. In 1947, the first MBA was offered, replacing the Master of Science in Business and the Master of Commercial Science. In 1950, the first doctoral degree, the Doctor of Commercial Science, was awarded.

Although classes had been held in Indianapolis since 1961, it wasn't until the fall of 1974 that the School of Business officially expanded to Indianapolis. It resides in the Business/Spea building on the IUI campus. During the expansion, it was said that the school is "one school, one faculty, one curriculum in two locations". Thus, rankings which apply to the school's Bloomington campus, also apply to its Indianapolis campus (for the programs they both share). The dean's office is located on the Bloomington campus, but two positions, Executive Associate Dean - Indianapolis and Associate Dean of Indianapolis Research and Programs, were created to lead the Kelley School of Business curriculum, faculty and programs at IUI.

In 1980, the Wall Street Journal reported Indiana University as one of the top four undergraduate business schools in the nation.

In 2013, the school started the Physician MBA program on the Indianapolis campus. The program brings in a physician-only cohort of students each August, with the program designed to allow physicians to continue working full time and complete their MBA in 21 months.

=== 21st century ===
Completed in 2003, the $33 million Graduate and Executive Education Center provides facilities to the Kelley School's graduate and executive education students.

In 2003, the Kelley School partnered with the Scotts Miracle-Gro Company to launch Bloomington Brands, a unique brand management work-study program for both undergraduates and MBA students. Participating students manage the Osmocote Plant Food brand under contract from Scotts. Bob Stohler, a former Scotts executive, instructs and oversees the students. Students manage all marketing variables for the Osmocote brand, including the selection of product formulas, sizes, packages, and pricing, as well as the development of marketing strategy, advertising, media purchase and selection, promotional activities, and consumer research. Brands students work closely with multiple business functions at Scotts.

In the summer of 2005, interim dean Dan Smith was appointed to be the new dean of the school, replacing Dean Dan Dalton who stepped down in 2004.

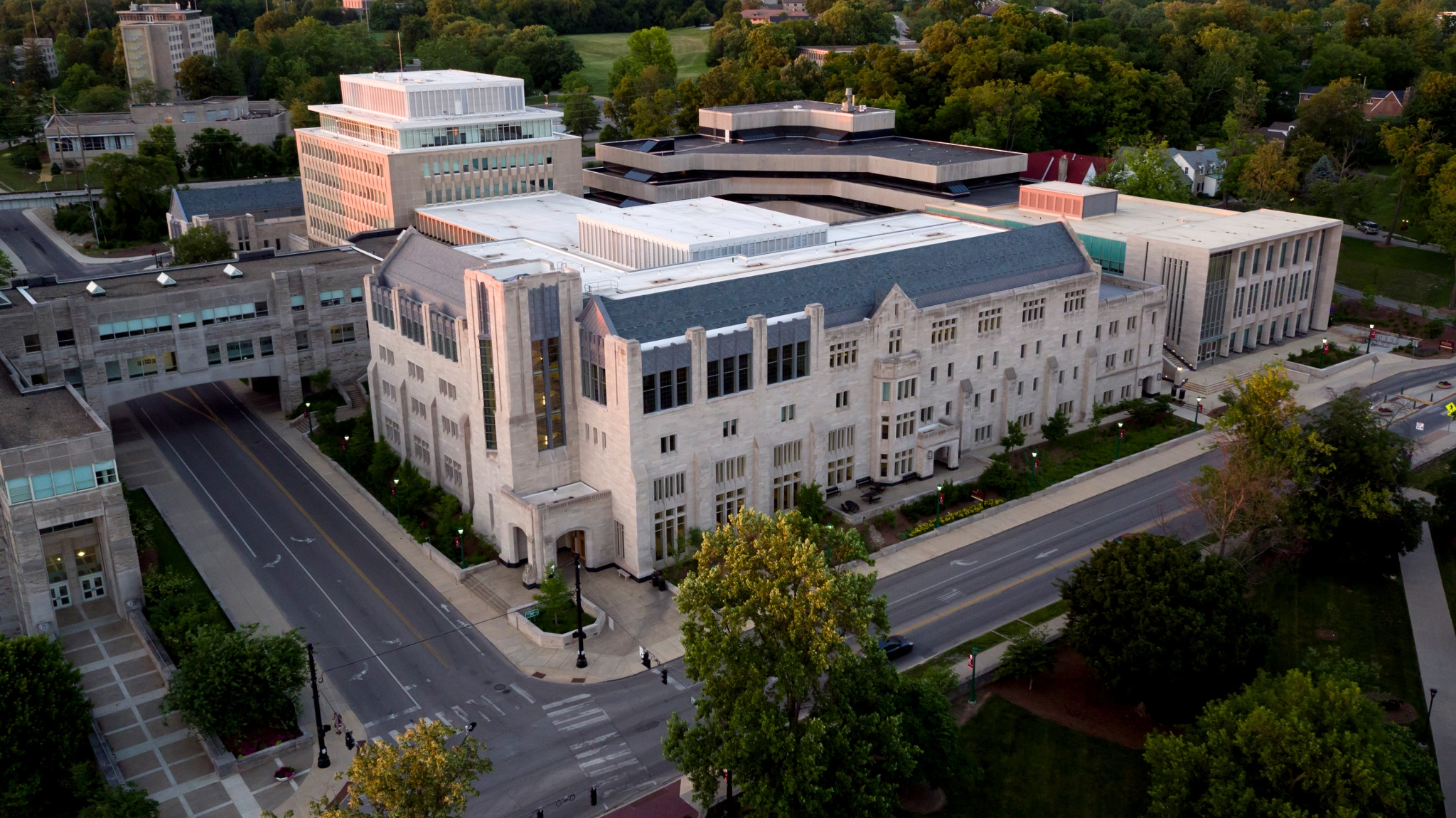
The Kelley School at Indiana University.

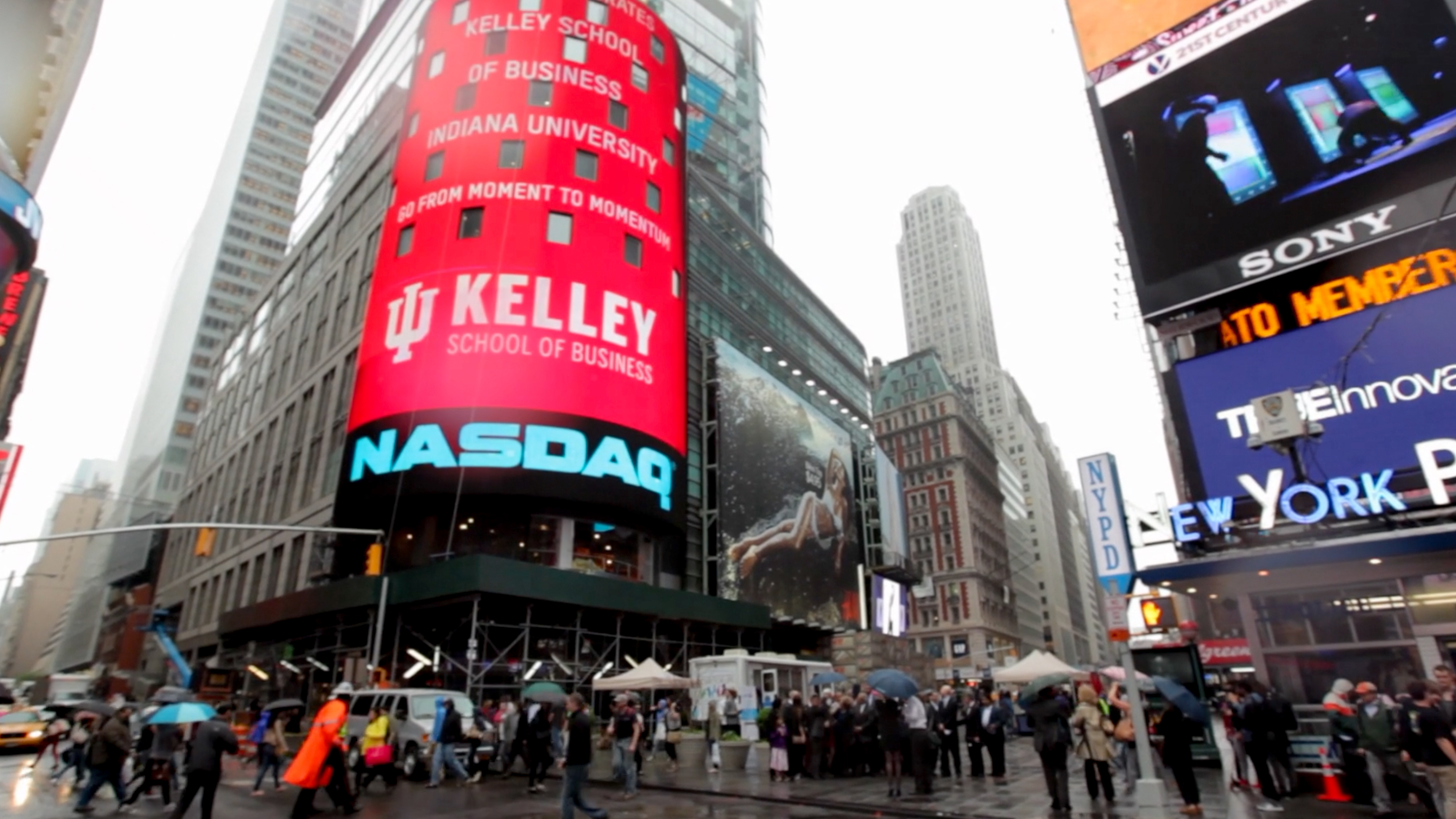
The Kelley School being featured at Nasdaq stock exchange in New York City.

On March 30, 2012, the Kelley School renamed its Undergraduate Building to Hodge Hall in honor of James R. Hodge, who had given $15 million to help renovate and expand the facility. The $60 million expansion and renovation of Hodge Hall broke ground in May 2012 and opened in the fall of 2014. The Eli Lilly Foundation donated a substantial amount as well.

In June 2012, Smith stepped down as dean of the school after serving as dean for seven years to take a new position as president and CEO of the Indiana University Foundation. On May 9, 2013, interim dean Idalene Kesner was announced as the new dean of the school. Kesner is the first woman to serve as dean

In February 2025, it was announced that Kelley accounting department faculty member, accounting professor, and current vice dean Patrick E. Hopkins would be taking over from Ash Soni as the dean of the Kelley School of Business, effective March 17, 2025.

In September 2026, the graduate division at Kelley School was named as the Jeffrey H. Thomasson Graduate School of Business. The Indiana University Board of Trustees approved the naming of the Kelley School of Business’ graduate division after Jeffrey and Benita Thomasson had contributed $95 million to the Kelley School of Business.

== Partnerships and exchange programs ==
The Kelley School has partnered with National Football League Players Association, Women's National Basketball Players Association, MLS Players Association, Major League Baseball Players Association and United States Rugby Players Association to pursue master's program for professional athletes.

Jacobs School of Music has partnered with the business school to offer an undergraduate music degree program from fall 2025.

The business school has student exchange programs with the following universities across the world: Aix-Marseille University, National University of Singapore, Technical University of Munich, Alliance Manchester Business School, Vietnam National University, Athens University of Economics and Business, Ss. Cyril and Methodius University of Skopje, Sungkyunkwan University, Monterrey Institute of Technology and Higher Education, and University of Indonesia.

== Organization and leadership ==
=== Deans ===
- William A. Rawles (1st Dean)
- Arthur M. Weimer (1939 to 1963)
- Schuyler F. Otteson (1971 to 1982)
- Jack R. Wentworth (1984 to 1993)
- Herman B Wells
- W. George Pinnell
- Idalene Kesner (2013 to 2022)
- Ash Soni (2022 to 2025)
- Patrick E. Hopkins (Current)

== Rankings ==
=== Undergraduate school ===
The Kelley School of Business undergraduate program is consistently ranked among the top 10 in the country across various publications.

In its most recent ranking, Bloomberg Businessweek ranked the undergraduate Kelley School of Business 1st among public business schools. Overall, it was ranked the 4th in the nation for its undergraduate B.S. in Business out of more than 100 of the top business schools in America. The prior year, Kelley was also ranked 4th. The 2016 ranking for "Best Undergraduate Business Schools" by Poets&Quants ranked the Kelley School of Business 7th in the nation and 2nd among public schools. Kelley is also ranked 2nd in academic excellence. In 2017, Poets & Quants ranks Kelley 6th in the nation, and 2nd in terms of employment. It lists an acceptance rate of around 37% and an average ACT and SAT of 30 and 1370 respectively. The Kelley School of Business is ranked 8th overall for its Undergraduate Business Program according to U.S. News & World Report. In a 2016 survey of over 1,000 recruiters by Businessweek, the undergraduate school was ranked 4th in the nation, 1st among public universities.

As of late 2017, 10 of Kelley's business concentrations have been ranked in the top 20. The undergraduate Entrepreneurship & Corporate Innovation major has been ranked 1st among public universities for the last 9 consecutive years.

=== Graduate school - Jeffrey H. Thomasson Graduate School of Business ===
Business school rankings

United States
- QS MBA: 18
- Bloomberg MBA: 31
- USNWR MBA: 22

Global
- QS MBA: 45
- Financial Times MBA: 40

In 2024, the Kelley MBA was ranked 20th overall by U.S. News & World Report. It was also ranked No. 31 Overall (28th in Compensation) in 2024 by Bloomberg Businessweek.

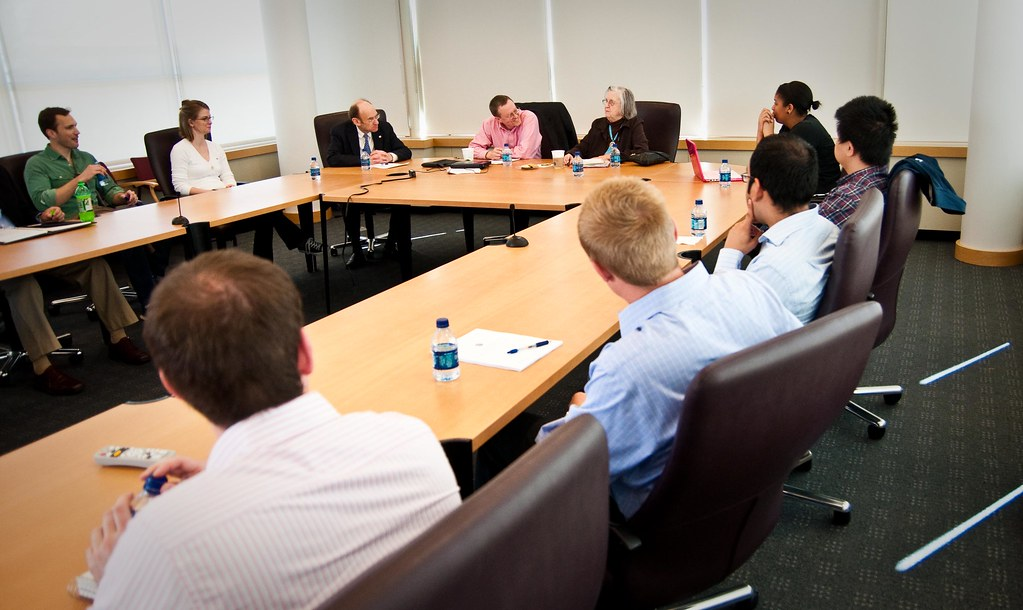
Nobel laureate Elinor Ostrom at Kelley School with MBA students in 2010.

The Kelley Online MBA consistently ranks #1 overall. In 2024, U.S. News and Poets&Quants both ranked it #1 overall.

In 2021, the Kelley Online MBA was ranked No. 1 by Poets&Quants.

In 2017, The Economist ranked the Kelley Master of Business Administration (MBA) program #22 in the world (17th in the U.S.). The Kelley MBA was ranked 16th by Business Week in 2014; it was ranked fifth for regional MBA programs by The Wall Street Journal in 2007. Poets&Quants ranked Kelley's MBA program 5th in the nation in producing Fortune 500 CEOs. Businessweek ranked its full-time MBA program at No. 15 in the 2012 edition, and at No. 4 among all public universities. U.S. News & World Report ranks the Kelley MBA 22nd in the nation, 7th among public business schools. Kelley's top-ranked MBA program for full-time residential students has been cited in Business Week as one of the favorites of corporate recruiters looking for general managers, marketing talent, and finance graduates.

The 2017 U.S. News & World Report ranked Kelley's Online Graduate Business Program #1 in the nation, and the online MBA #3.

A 2017 report by Crist|Kolder Associates listed Indiana University 5th in producing current Fortune 500 CEOs and 1st in producing Fortune 500 CFOs among public institutions.

The Graduate Entrepreneurship concentration has been ranked 1st for three consecutive years. In the 2010 QS Global 200 Business Schools Report the school was indexed as the 24th best business school in North America. Fortune Small Business magazine listed Kelley's MBA and undergraduate programs in entrepreneurship #1 among all public universities in the nation in 2009.

== Publications ==
Indiana Business Review was started in 1925 and is published quarterly by the Indiana Business Research Center. The business school also publishes Business Horizons, a bimonthly academic journal first published in 1956.

The business school publishes Kelley Research Bulletin which highlights research activities at the school. It features papers accepted for publication in refereed journals, SSRN working papers, and research database information. The Kelley School is ranked top 10 worldwide on research contributions.

== Institutes, centers, and labs ==
The school has several institutes, labs, and centers.

=== Institutes ===
- Kinsey-Kelley Center in collaboration with Kinsey Institute
- Institute for Environmental and Social Sustainability
- Institute for Environmental and Social Sustainability
- Institute for Corporate Governance & Ethics

=== Labs ===
- Sustainability & Innovation Lab
- Data Science and AI Lab

=== Centers ===
- Johnson Center for Entrepreneurship & Innovation
- Center for the Business of Life Sciences
- Tobias Leadership Center
- Center for Brand Leadership
- Center for Global Sales Leadership
- Center for Education and Research in Retail
- Center for Real Estate Studies
- Center for Excellence in Manufacturing

== Student life ==
The Kelley School of Business has 91 independent student organizations. The students support a wide array of student-run organizations, including Kelley Student Government, a representative governmental body and voice of all undergraduate students. The Undergraduate Business Council, student-led organization focused on representing and advocating for the undergraduate business student body.

One of Kelley's signature traditions is the Kelley Carnival, an annual fall event that kicks off the academic year with games, live music, food trucks, and a showcase of student clubs and organizations. Kelley MBA students also embrace the culture of camaraderie through events like the Kelley MBA Tailgate, held during Indiana University home football games.

== Notable alumni ==
=== Business ===
- Klaus Agthe, Former Chairman and CEO of ASEA Brown Boveri
- Gregory W. Becker, Former CEO of SVB Financial Group
- John Chambers, President and CEO of Cisco Systems
- Cheng Wai Keung, multimillionaire and business magnate
- Mark Cuban, billionaire and former owner of the Dallas Mavericks
- Jeff M. Fettig, chairman and CEO of the Whirlpool Corporation
- Janet Foutty, former CEO and Chair of Deloitte Consulting
- Harold Poling, former CEO and Chairman of Ford Motor Company
- Frank Popoff, Former President and CEO of The Dow Chemical Company
- Conrad Prebys, billionaire and property developer
- Jay Schottenstein, billionaire and owner of DSW, Inc. and American Eagle Outfitters
- David Simon, billionaire and CEO of Simon Property Group
- Michael Szymanczyk, chairman and CEO of Altria and Philip Morris USA
- Randy Tobias, former CEO of Eli Lilly and Company
- Todd Wagner, billionaire and co-founder of Broadcast.com
- Jimmy Wales, co-founder of Wikipedia and President of the Wikimedia Foundation

=== Politics ===
- Jerry Abramson, 55th Lieutenant Governor of Kentucky
- Stephen Akard, Former Inspector General of the Department of State
- Khaled Mohammed Salem Balama Al Tameemi, governor of the Central Bank of the United Arab Emirates
- Evan Bayh, 46th Governor of Indiana
- Nick Begich III, U.S. representative for Alaska's at-large congressional district
- Shella Bowlin, Cherokee Nation Secretary of State
- Deepender Singh Hooda, Member of the Lok Sabha

=== Academics ===
- Ahmed Rashad Abdel-khalik, Professor at Gies College of Business
- Benjamin J. Allen, 9th President of the University of Northern Iowa
- Roger Ibbotson, professor emeritus at Yale School of Management
- Lance de Masi, Former President of American University in Dubai

=== Armed Forces ===
- Edward L. Anderson, Former Rear Admiral in United States Navy
- William H. Gourley, Former Major General in the United States Army
- Anthony R. Jones, Former Lieutenant General in United States Army
- Norris W. Overton, Former Brigadier General in the United States Air Force.

=== Jurists ===
- Geoffrey Slaughter, Associate Justice of the Indiana Supreme Court

=== Sports ===
- John Bitove, founder of the Toronto Raptors of the NBA.
- John Cynn
- Jordan Franks
- Stephen Gostkowski (MBA)
- Frank McKinney, Olympic gold medalist
- Ali Patberg
- Bryan Witzmann

== Notable faculty ==
- Jerome Adams, 20th Surgeon General of the United States
- Herman Aguinis, Former John F. Mee Chair of Management
- Alexandra, Countess of Frederiksborg, professor - former Princess of Denmark
- David B. Audretsch, professor - award-winning economist, published author, and founder and editor-in-chief of Small Business Economics
- Michael Baye, professor - former Director of the Bureau of Economics for the US Federal Trade Commission
- Alan Dennis
- Timothy L. Fort, Professor of Business Law and Ethics
- Mae Jemison, former NASA astronaut
- Martin O'Malley, 61st Governor of Maryland
- Peter Pace, 16th Chairman of the Joint Chiefs of Staff (Note: From 2008 to 2010, Peter Pace served as leader-in-residence and the Poling Chair of Business and Government for the Kelley School of Business, Indiana University.)
- Vikram Pandit, Former CEO of Citigroup
- John Rau, four-time CEO and Poling Chair of Business and Government Leadership at the Kelley School (2024–25 academic year)
- Wayne L. Winston, professor emeritus
- Shelli Yoder, professor - former Democratic Party nominee for the U.S. House of Representatives

== See also ==
- Economics
- Glossary of economics
