= Florence Township, Goodhue County, Minnesota =

Florence Township, Minnesota
- Township
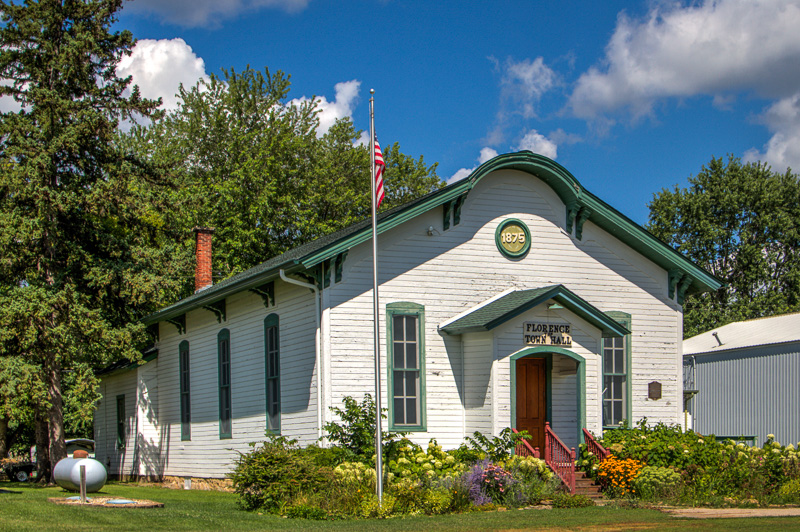
- Town hall

- Location within the state of Minnesota Florence Township, Minnesota (the United States)
- Coordinates: 44°30′34″N 92°21′10″W
- Country: United States
- State: Minnesota
- County: Goodhue

Area
  - Total: 40.5 sq mi (105.0 km^{2})
  - Land: 34.9 sq mi (90.5 km^{2})
  - Water: 5.6 sq mi (14.6 km^{2})
- Elevation: 712 ft (217 m)

Population (2000)
  - Total: 1,450
  - Density: 41/sq mi (16/km^{2})
- Time zone: UTC-6 (Central (CST))
  - Summer (DST): UTC-5 (CDT)
- FIPS code: 27-21392
- GNIS feature ID: 0664180
- Website: http://florencetwpmn.gov/

Florence Township is a township in Goodhue County, Minnesota, United States. The population was 1,450 at the 2000 census. A small part of the city of Lake City extends geographically within the township, but is a separate entity. The unincorporated area of Frontenac is also located within the township.

== History ==
Florence Township was organized in 1858, and named for Florence Graham, the daughter of a county judge.

== Geography ==
According to the United States Census Bureau, the township has a total area of 40.5 square miles (105 km^{2}), of which 34.9 square miles (90 km^{2}) is land and 5.6 square miles (15 km^{2}) (13.88%) is water.

=== Major highways ===
- U.S. Route 61, U.S. Route 63 (Co-signed throughout the township).

=== Lakes and streams ===
==== Major ====
- Mississippi River
- Lake Pepin

==== Minor ====
- Frontenac Lake
- Sugar Loaf Creek
- Wells Creek

=== Parks ===
- Frontenac State Park
- Perched Valley Wildlife Management Area
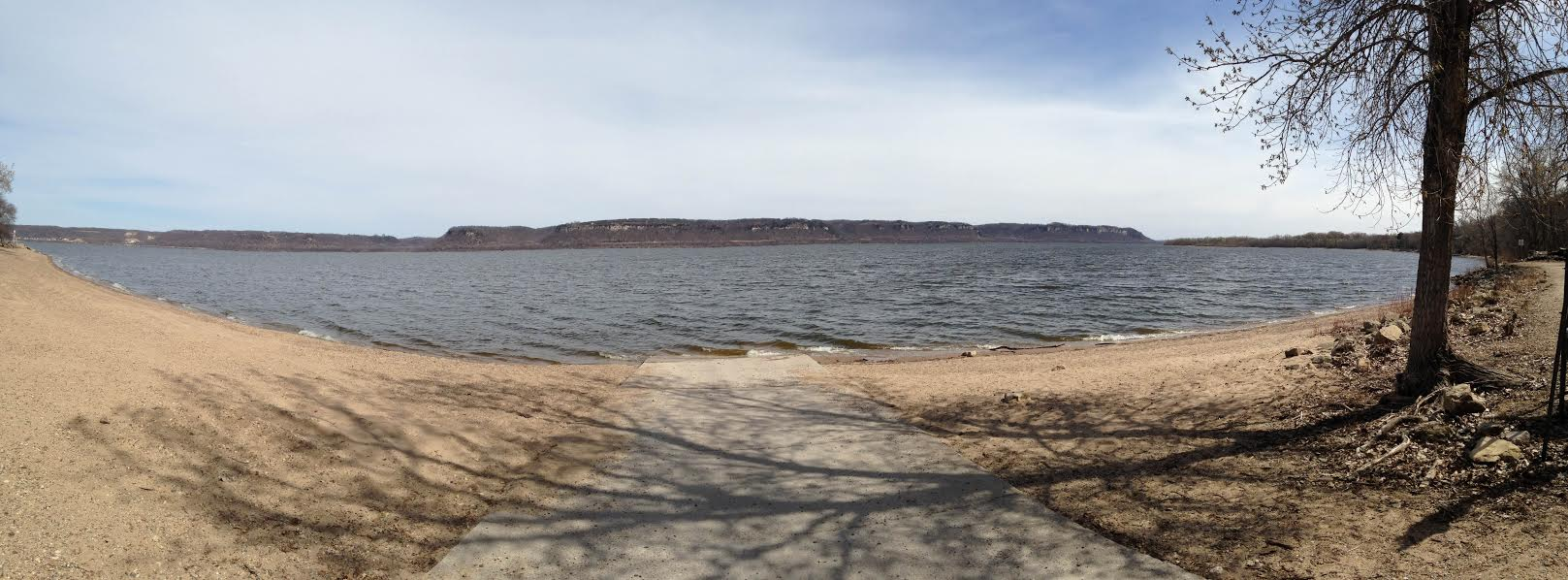
Panoramic view of Lake Pepin from Florence Township's public beach in Frontenac.

== Demographics ==
As of the census of 2000, there were 1,450 people, 524 households, and 408 families residing in the township. The population density was 41.5 inhabitants per square mile (16.0/km^{2}). There were 633 housing units at an average density of 18.1 per square mile (7.0/km^{2}). The racial makeup of the township was 98.76% White, 0.41% African American, 0.41% Native American, 0.28% Asian, and 0.14% from two or more races. Hispanic or Latino of any race were 0.34% of the population.

There were 524 households, out of which 32.1% had children under the age of 18 living with them, 69.5% were married couples living together, 4.4% had a female householder with no husband present, and 22.1% were non-families. 18.1% of all households were made up of individuals, and 6.7% had someone living alone who was 65 years of age or older. The average household size was 2.57 and the average family size was 2.90.

In the township the population was spread out, with 23.5% under the age of 18, 4.6% from 18 to 24, 24.3% from 25 to 44, 29.3% from 45 to 64, and 18.3% who were 65 years of age or older. The median age was 44 years. For every 100 females, there were 93.3 males. For every 100 females age 18 and over, there were 94.9 males.

The median income for a household in the township was $53,971, and the median income for a family was $59,297. Males had a median income of $35,260 versus $26,957 for females. The per capita income for the township was $24,276. About 2.1% of families and 4.4% of the population were below the poverty line, including 4.8% of those under age 18 and 7.2% of those age 65 or over.
