= Pepin Township, Wabasha County, Minnesota =

Pepin Township, Minnesota
- Township
- Location within the state of Minnesota Pepin Township, Minnesota (the United States)
- Coordinates: 44°22′51″N 92°7′42″W
- Country: United States
- State: Minnesota
- County: Wabasha

Area
  - Total: 21.5 sq mi (55.8 km^{2})
  - Land: 17.6 sq mi (45.5 km^{2})
  - Water: 4.0 sq mi (10.3 km^{2})
- Elevation: 1,109 ft (338 m)

Population (2000)
  - Total: 471
  - Density: 27/sq mi (10.3/km^{2})
- Time zone: UTC-6 (Central (CST))
  - Summer (DST): UTC-5 (CDT)
- FIPS code: 27-50362
- GNIS feature ID: 0665278

Pepin Township is a township in Wabasha County, Minnesota, United States. The population was 471 at the 2000 census. The unincorporated communities of Maple Springs, Camp Lacupolis and Reads Landing are in the township.

Pepin Township was organized in 1858 and named after Lake Pepin.

== Geography ==
According to the United States Census Bureau, the township has a total area of 21.6 square miles (55.8 km^{2}); 17.6 square miles (45.5 km^{2}) of it is land and 4.0 square miles (10.3 km^{2}) of it (18.51%) is water. The township contains three properties listed on the National Register of Historic Places: the Precolumbian King Coulee Site, the 1870 Reads Landing School, and the 1940 Reads Landing Overlook.

== Demographics ==
As of the census of 2000, there were 471 people, 170 households, and 131 families residing in the township. The population density was 26.8 inhabitants per square mile (10.3/km^{2}). There were 210 housing units at an average density of 11.9/sq mi (4.6/km^{2}). The racial makeup of the township was 98.30% White, 0.42% Native American, 0.85% Asian, and 0.42% from two or more races. Hispanic or Latino of any race were 1.91% of the population.

There were 170 households, out of which 37.1% had children under 18 living with them, 68.2% were married couples living together, 3.5% had a female householder with no husband present, and 22.9% were non-families. 17.1% of all households comprised individuals, and 4.1% had someone living alone aged 65 years or older. The average household size was 2.77, and the average family size was 3.14.

The population was spread out in the township, with 27.6% under 18, 7.4% from 18 to 24, 22.9% from 25 to 44, 28.2% from 45 to 64, and 13.8% aged 65 years or older. The median age was 41 years. For every 100 females, there were 94.6 males. For every 100 females age 18 and over, there were 96.0 males.

The median income for a household in the township was $46,563, and the median income for a family was $51,563. Males had a median income of $32,000 versus $26,250 for females. The per capita income for the township was $20,741. About 5.3% of families and 5.5% of the population were below the poverty line, including none of those under age 18 and 17.7% of those age 65 or over.
