= Frontenac =

Frontenac may refer to:

== People ==
- Louis de Buade de Frontenac, Governor of New France

== Places ==
=== Canada ===
Quebec

- Château Frontenac, hotel in Quebec City
- Frontenac, Quebec
- Frontenac County, Quebec
- Frontenac (Montreal Metro), Montreal Metro station
- Frontenac National Park (Parc national de Frontenac)
- Frontenac (provincial electoral district), Quebec provincial electoral district
- Frontenac (Quebec federal electoral district), former federal electoral district
- Frontenac (1912–1973 provincial electoral district), former Quebec provincial electoral district
- Frontenac Lake (Milieu River), Lac-Ashuapmushuan, RCM Le Domaine-du-Roy, Saguenay-Lac-Saint-Jean

Ontario

- Fort Frontenac, French fort and trading post located in what is now Kingston, Ontario
- Frontenac County:
  - Township of Central Frontenac
  - Township of Frontenac Islands
  - Township of North Frontenac
  - Township of South Frontenac
- Frontenac Provincial Park, a provincial park near Kingston, Ontario
- Frontenac Public School, Burlington, Ontario
- Frontenac Secondary School, Kingston, Ontario
- Frontenac (Ontario electoral district), former federal electoral district
- Frontenac (Ontario provincial electoral district), former provincial electoral district

=== France ===
- Frontenac, Gironde
- Frontenac, Lot

=== United States ===
- Frontenac, Kansas
- Frontenac, Minnesota
  - Frontenac State Park
- Frontenac, Missouri
- Frontenac, Florida

== Automotive ==
- Abendroth & Root Manufacturing Co, produced automobiles under the name Frontenac 1906-1913
- Frontenac Motor Corporation, a joint racing-car venture of Louis and Gaston Chevrolet 1916-1921
- Dominion Motors Frontenac, a division of Durant Motors that built and sold automobiles in Canada 1931-1933
- Frontenac (marque), an automobile introduced in 1960 by Ford Motor Company of Canada

== Others ==
- Frontenac (grape)
- Frontenac Axis, a geological feature in Canada and the United States
- Lac Frontenac or Lac de Frontenac, an old name for Lake Ontario
- PS Frontenac, first paddle steamer launched on the Great Lakes
- McColl-Frontanac Oil Company, a Canadian company acquired by Texaco in 1956
- Frontenac: or The Atotarho of the Iroquois, a poem by Alfred Billings Street
- Kingston Frontenacs, a major junior hockey team in the Ontario Hockey League
- Frontenac Company, an American private equity firm
