= King Coulee Site =

Archaeological site in Minnesota, US

- U.S. National Register of Historic Places
- Location: Address restricted, Pepin Township, Minnesota
- Built: c. 1500 BCE – 1300 CE
- NRHP reference No.: 94000340
- Designated: April 8, 1994

The King Coulee Site (Smithsonian trinomial 21WB56) is a prehistoric Native American archaeological site in Pepin Township, Minnesota, United States. It was listed on the National Register of Historic Places in 1994 for having state-level significance in the theme of archaeology. It was nominated for being a largely undisturbed occupation site with intact stratigraphy and numerous biofacts stretching from the late Archaic period to the Oneota period. This timeframe spans roughly from 3,500 to 500 years ago. The site yielded the oldest known evidence of domesticated plants in Minnesota: seeds dated to 2,500 years ago from the squash Cucurbita pepo.

== Description ==
The King Coulee Site is located near the mouth of a valley that empties into Lake Pepin. The stream that carved the valley—or "coulee" in the parlance of the Driftless Area—carried sediments down into a small floodplain. Over the centuries the sediments grew deeper while Lake Pepin's water level rose, creating a 4.5-metre-deep (15 ft) layer of saturated soil that preserves organic material stretching back 3,500 years. The biofacts include wood, nut shells, and seeds.

From the earliest date of inhabitation the steep-sided coulee would have been forested and watered by a perennial stream. These factors provided shelter from sun, wind, and forest fires. A variety of food resources from fish and shellfish to waterfowl and game mammals were present or nearby. Since Lake Pepin is a natural widening of the Mississippi River, the site was on a major transportation corridor.

== History ==
The site was first occupied by humans around 3,500 years ago during the Archaic period. This is based on findings of projectile points, stone tools, faunal and botanical remains, and an absence of ceramics. A later Archaic occupation around 2,300 years ago has also been identified from two projectile points surrounded by a quantity of charcoal.

Two Cucurbita pepo seeds recovered from the site have been radiocarbon dated to 2530±60 Before Present (BP), during the Late Archaic. To date these are the oldest evidence of cultigens in the Upper Midwest. Previously the oldest appearance of Cucurbita pepo in the region was from the Middle Woodland, found near Prairie du Chien, Wisconsin, and dated to around 160 CE.

Archaeologists speculate that the site was occupied by seasonal encampments in the late summer or fall during the Early Woodland period, about 1,940 years ago. The one deposit identified from this period contained sand-tempered ceramics and a small midden composed of mussel shells, animals bones, nut shells, and a few stone tools. Middle Woodland use is echoed only by a scatter of grit-tempered ceramics. More abundant are thin, grit-tempered ceramics with a variety of surface treatments characteristic of the Late Woodland period.

The upper strata of the site contain shell-tempered ceramics indicative of the Oneota people.

Railroad tracks were laid across the mouth of the coulee in 1876 but did not substantially impact the site. Sometime later in the 19th century a flood deposited one or two meters of sediment on top of the site, insulating it from later impacts such as the construction of U.S. Route 61 in the 1930s. The site was unknown to modern people until 1987, when an archaeological survey was conducted in advance of roadwork on the highway. When the significance of the site was recognized, the Minnesota Department of Transportation redesigned their plans to keep it intact. The survey ultimately excavated seven test pits and eight trenches, uncovering 25,000 artifacts and biofacts. 66% of these were faunal remains like bones and shells, 19% were lithics, 14% were ceramic sherds, and 1% were botanical remains like wood, charcoal, and seeds.

== Significance ==
The King Coulee Site is significant on three major points. First, it preserves a deep and well stratified cultural sequence ranging from the Archaic period through the Woodland and up to Oneota times. This is virtually unique within Southeast Minnesota, where most sites have thin layers from which it is difficult to establish firm chronologies about what material is characteristic of which period. Such sequencing has hitherto been based on extrapolations from better stratified sites in Wisconsin and Iowa, so the King Coulee Site is valuable for providing a local source for this analysis. In particular it can provide future researchers with a clearer chronology of the region's little-documented transition between the Archaic and Woodland periods.

The site's second area of significance is in the rare abundance of biofacts, which are valuable for research on prehistoric resource use. The presence of domestic squash seeds in the Archaic strata is especially revealing, as this is the northernmost evidence of its presence during that period. In the words of archaeologist Bradley Perkl, it demonstrates that "use of domesticated plants occurred much earlier in the region than previously acknowledged" and supports the revisionist theory that later domestic crops such as maize "were incorporated into existing horticultural systems".

Finally, the minimal impacts to the King Coulee Site since European contact lend it additional significance as an archaeological resource.

== See also ==
- National Register of Historic Places listings in Wabasha County, Minnesota
