= Camp Lacupolis, Minnesota =

Unincorporated community in Minnesota, United States

Camp Lacupolis
- Unincorporated community
- Location within Minnesota Location within the United States
- Coordinates: 44°24′34″N 92°06′56″W
- Country: United States
- State: Minnesota
- County: Wabasha County
- Township: Pepin Township
- Elevation: 709 ft (216 m)
- Time zone: UTC-6 (Central (CST))
  - Summer (DST): UTC-5 (CDT)
- ZIP code: 55041
- Area code: 651
- GNIS feature ID: 640813

Camp Lacupolis is an unincorporated community in Pepin Township, Wabasha County, Minnesota, United States, along the Mississippi River and Lake Pepin.

The community is located between Lake City and Wabasha along U.S. Highway 61 near 223rd Avenue.

Nearby places include Lake City, Wabasha, Maple Springs, and Reads Landing.

It is a historic fishing community along the Mississippi River and Lake Pepin known for its resorts. The name Camp Lacupolis means "Camp Lake City" in Greek.
