= Maple Springs, Minnesota =

Unincorporated community in Minnesota, United States

Maple Springs
- Unincorporated community
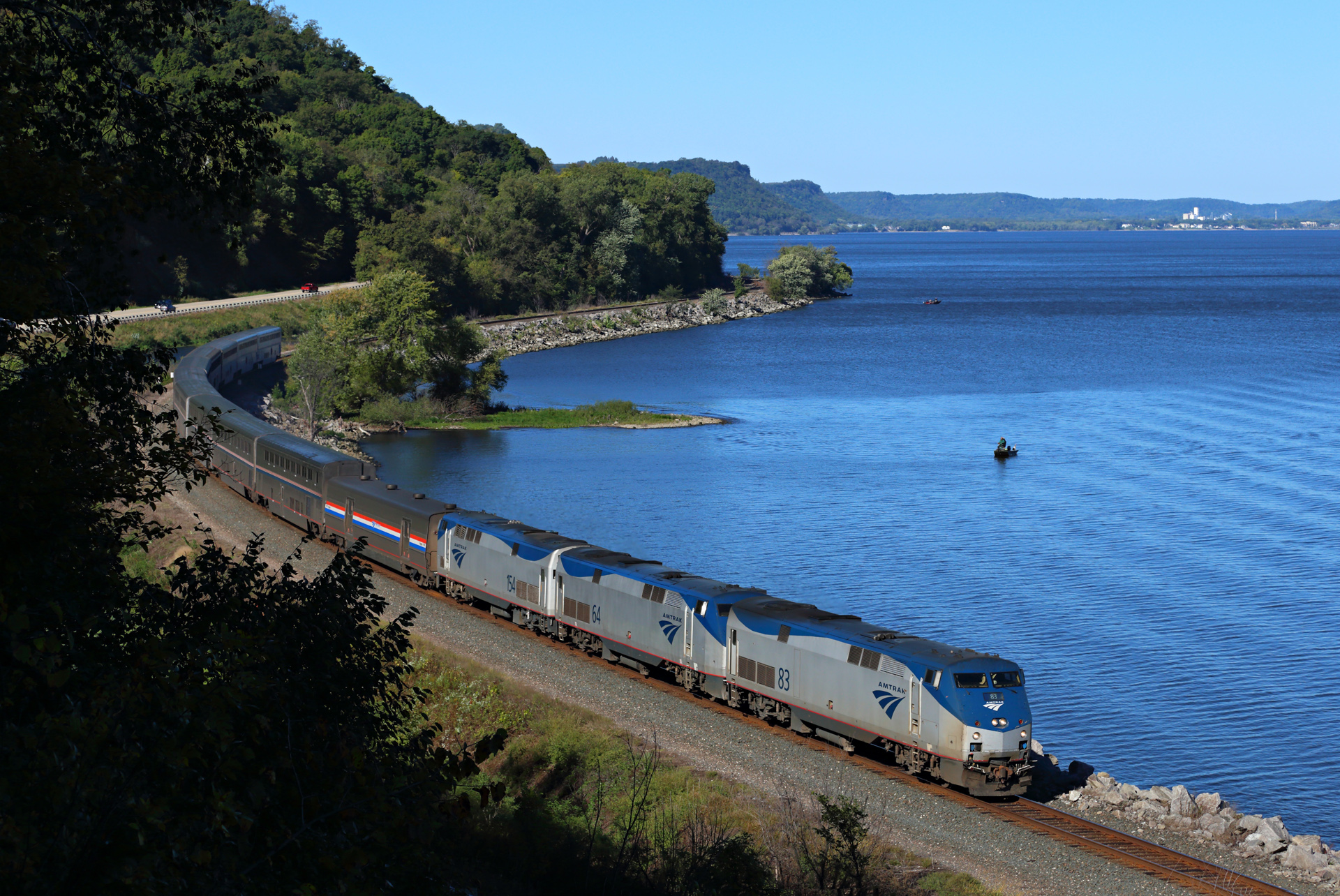
- Amtrak's Empire Builder passes through Maple Springs in 2018

- Location within Minnesota Location within the United States
- Coordinates: 44°24′35″N 92°09′43″W
- Country: United States
- State: Minnesota
- County: Wabasha
- Township: Pepin Township
- Elevation: 764 ft (233 m)
- Time zone: UTC-6 (Central (CST))
  - Summer (DST): UTC-5 (CDT)
- ZIP code: 55041
- Area code: 651
- GNIS feature ID: 654818

Maple Springs is an unincorporated community in Pepin Township, Wabasha County, Minnesota, United States, along the Mississippi River and Lake Pepin. The Mississippi River and King Creek meet at Maple Springs.

The community is located between Lake City and Wabasha along U.S. Highway 61 at the intersection with 247th Avenue.

Nearby places include Lake City, Wabasha, Camp Lacupolis, and Reads Landing.

Maple Springs was originally named King's Cooley, after a coulee on the farm of a nearby settler named King. It had a station on the former Chicago, Milwaukee and St. Paul Railroad – the "Milwaukee Road".

Amtrak’s Empire Builder, which operates between Seattle/Portland and Chicago, passes through the town on BNSF tracks, but makes no stop. The nearest station is located in Red Wing, 23 miles (37 km) to the northwest. Maple Springs remains a popular location for railroad photography, due to the sweeping curve nestled between the scenic high bluffs and wide expanse of Lake Pepin along the river.

Local businesses include a fishing resort along Lake Pepin.
