= Reads Landing, Minnesota =

Unincorporated community in Minnesota, United States

Reads Landing
- Unincorporated community
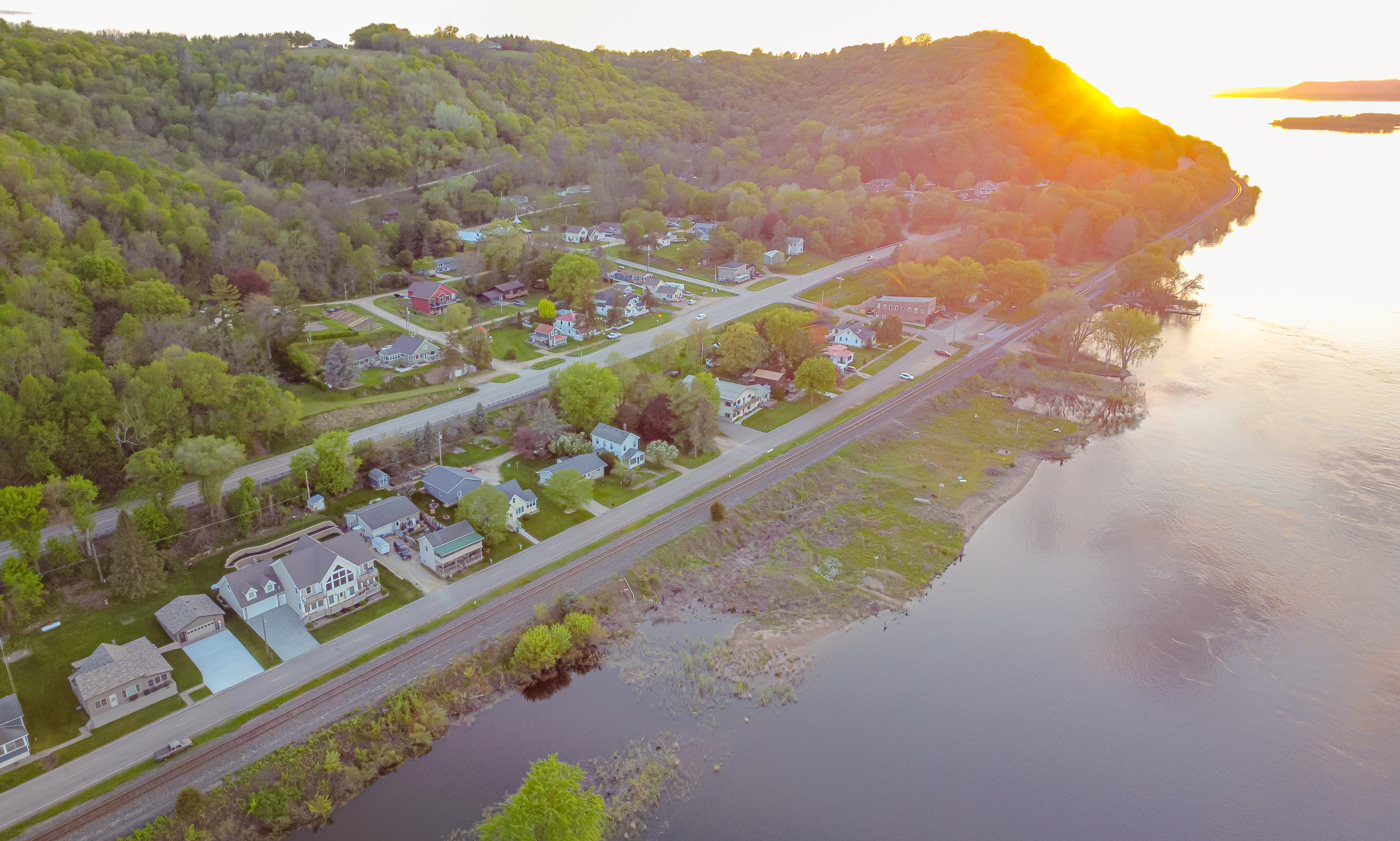
- US-61 and the Canadian Pacific Railway run through town

- Location within Minnesota Location within the United States
- Coordinates: 44°24′08″N 92°04′45″W
- Country: United States
- State: Minnesota
- County: Wabasha County
- Township: Pepin Township
- Elevation: 709 ft (216 m)

Population (2014)
  - Total: 164
- Time zone: UTC-6 (Central (CST))
  - Summer (DST): UTC-5 (CDT)
- ZIP code: 55968
- Area code: 651
- GNIS feature ID: 649857

Reads Landing is an unincorporated community in Pepin Township, Wabasha County, Minnesota, United States, along the Mississippi River. The community is located between Lake City and Wabasha along U.S. Highway 61 at the junction with Wabasha County Road 77 and near Wabasha, Lake City, Camp Lacupolis, and Maple Springs. Reads Landing is located within section 24 of Pepin Township.

== History ==
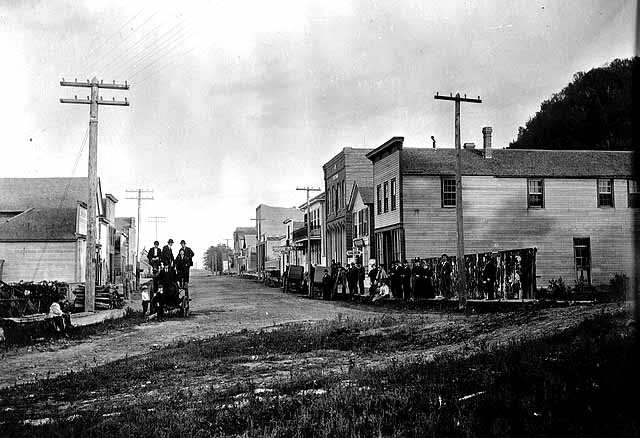
Main Street (circa 1872)

Reads Landing was platted in 1856. Around 1878, the community had various commercial and transportation buildings, but later those businesses moved to Wabasha. The post office began in 1850 and still operates today. At one time, Reads Landing was considered a possible site for the Minnesota state capital.

The community contains one property listed on the National Register of Historic Places: the 1870 Reads Landing School. The school building now houses the Wabasha County Historical Society Museum.

Historical population
Census	Pop.	Note	%±
1870	782		—
1880	579		−26.0%
1890	446		−23.0%
U.S. Decennial Census

== Transportation ==
Amtrak’s Empire Builder, which operates between Seattle/Portland and Chicago, passes through the town on BNSF tracks, but makes no stop. The nearest station is located in Red Wing, 27 miles (43 km) to the northwest.

== Notable people ==
- James Huff Stout (1848–1910), former Wisconsin legislator and businessman; lived in Reads Landing.
