= Reads Landing School =

- U.S. National Register of Historic Places
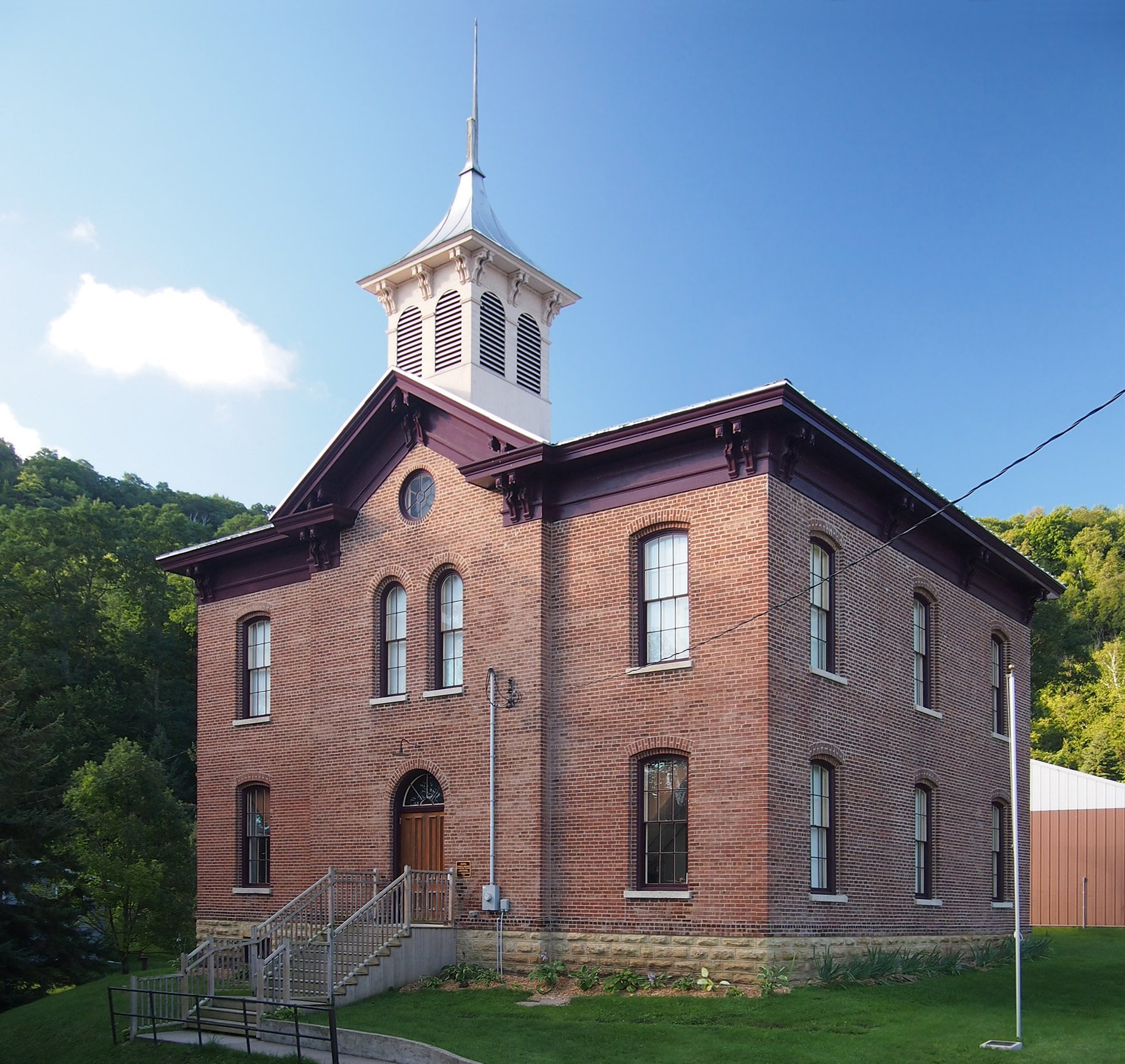
- Reads Landing School viewed from the north

- Location within Minnesota Location within the United States
- Location: 70537 206th Avenue, Reads Landing, Minnesota
- Coordinates: 44°24′4.3″N 92°4′46.2″W
- Area: Less than one acre
- Built: 1870
- Built by: Daniel C. Hill
- Architectural style: Italianate
- NRHP reference No.: 88003217
- Designated: January 19, 1989

Reads Landing School is a former school building in the unincorporated community of Reads Landing, Minnesota, United States. Built in 1870, it has been converted into the Wabasha County Historical Society Museum. The building is one of the state's oldest surviving brick schools, and typifies their characteristic boxy, bracketed, Italianate style. The school was listed on the National Register of Historic Places in 1989 for having local significance in the themes of architecture and exploration/settlement. It was nominated for being a rare surviving example of Minnesota's early brick schools, and for its association with Reads Landing's peak as a lumber milling boomtown.

== Description ==
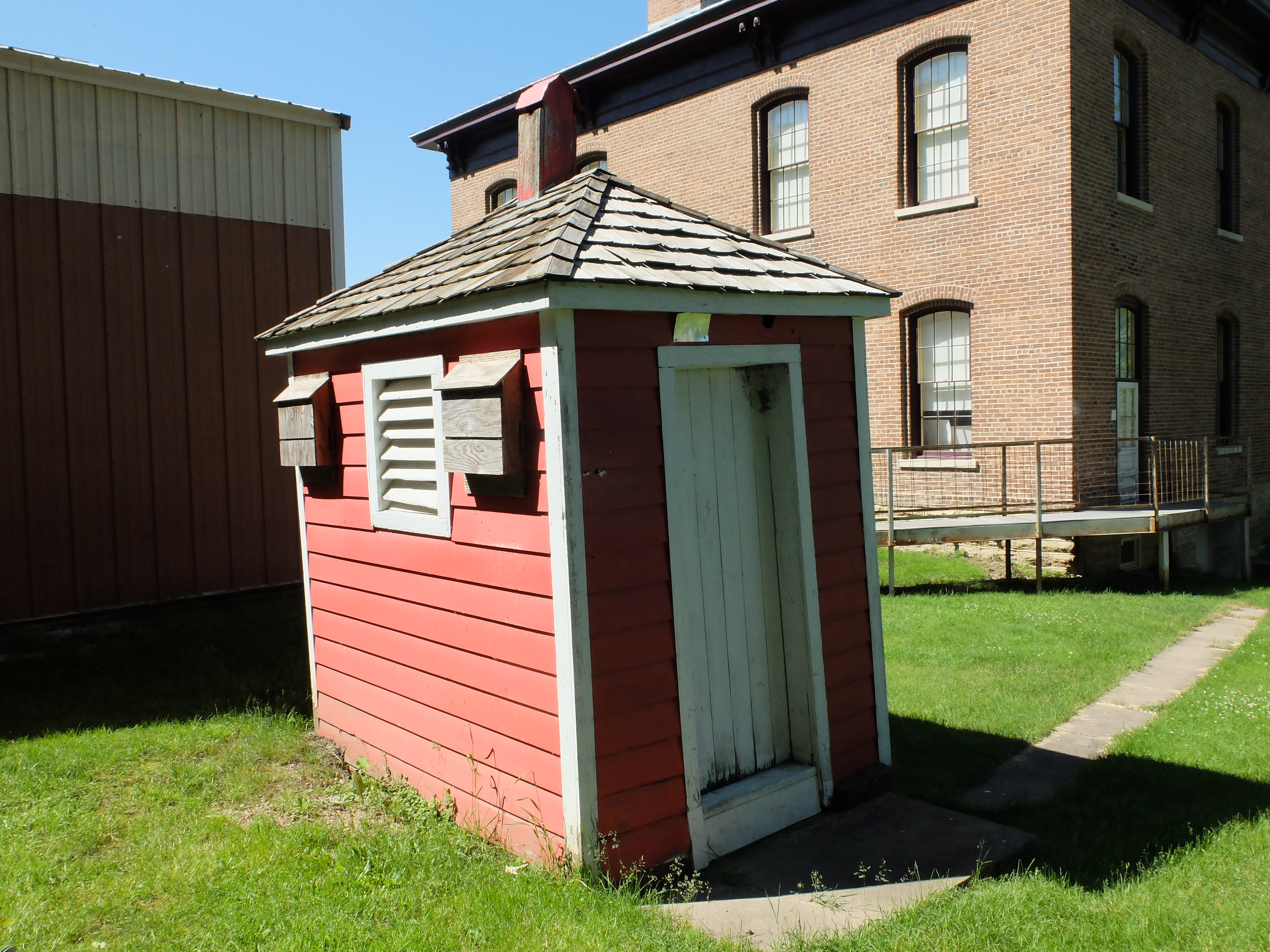
The original outhouse for the Reads Landing School

Reads Landing School is a two-story brick building on a limestone foundation. Its footprint is nearly square. A gabled central bay projects slightly from the front façade. The building has a hip roof, with a cupola atop the gable. A wide cornice overhangs the building, supported by pairs of heavy brackets emerging from the frieze. At the base of the walls, an unusual water table is formed by three projecting courses of bricks atop the protruding limestone foundation.

The windows have segmental brick arches and limestone sills. The central front bay is distinguished by a semicircular fantail window over the main doors, semicircular arches over the second story windows, and an oculus window illuminating the attic. In the interior, both floors have two rooms with a hall across the front.

== History ==
Reads Landing was platted in 1856 overlooking the confluence of the Mississippi and Chippewa Rivers. It was ideally sited for riverboat traffic and the booming lumber trade, and success as a lumber milling center swelled the population. In 1870, flush with wealth, the town replaced its 1858 frame schoolhouse with this stately brick structure. Twenty percent of the $8,200 cost was funded by liquor licenses; at its peak Reads Landing had 21 saloons.

Early architects Abraham M. Radcliffe and Charles G. Maybury popularized squarish, Italianate government buildings in Southeast Minnesota, both for schools and courthouses. Wabasha County's first large brick school was constructed in 1869 in Wabasha, closely patterned after Goodhue County's 1865 courthouse. Both were cruciform whereas the Reads Landing School and its 1872 near-twin in Lake City were both cubical with a single entrance. The only one of these four buildings still standing, the Reads Landing School reflects the emergence of the boxy Italianate school in imitation of government buildings and its evolution into a smaller and more practical form. Contractor Daniel C. Hill of Red Wing was involved in all four projects, and the unusual brick water table appeared on each as if it were his architectural signature.

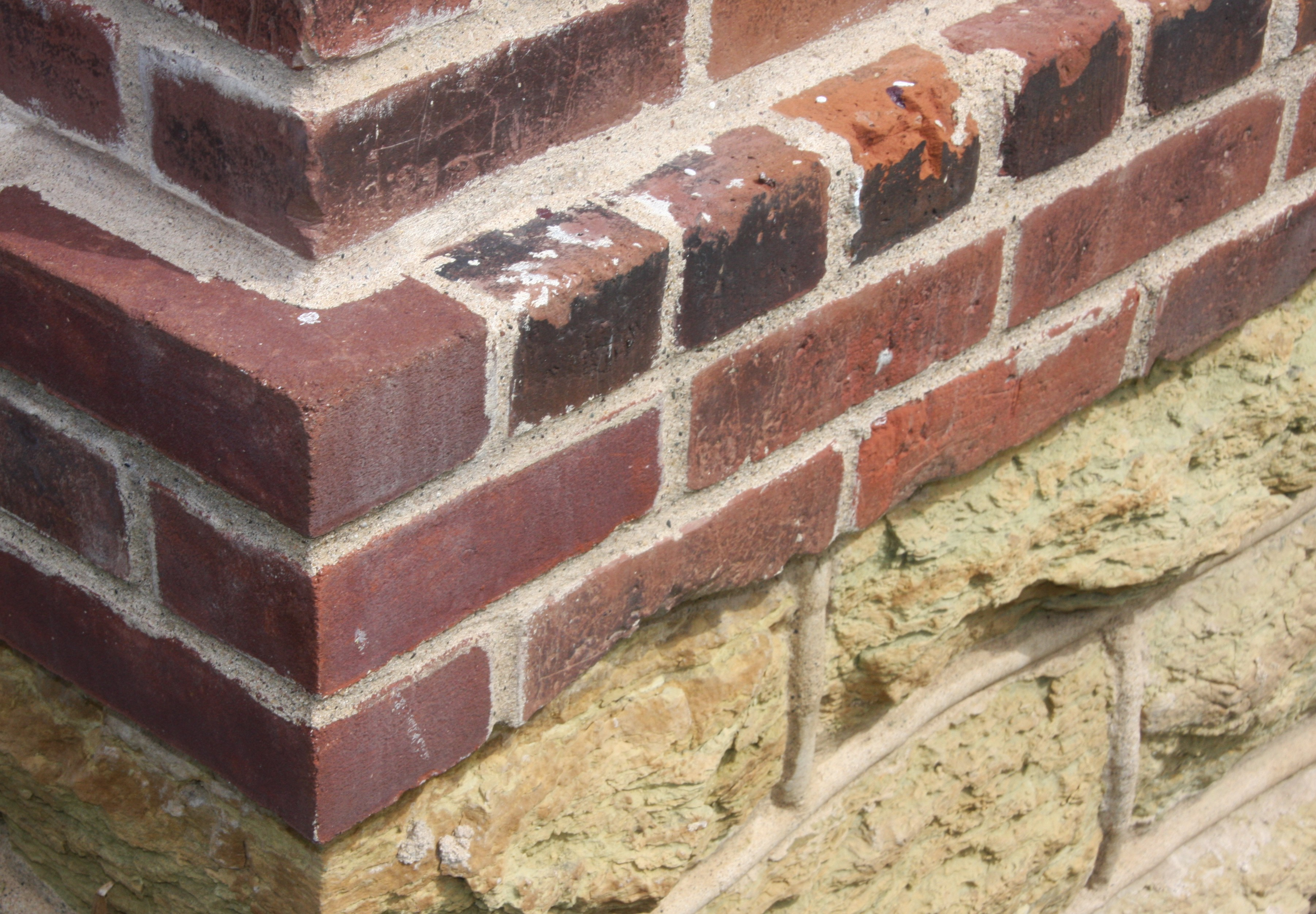
Brick water table

In 1882 the Chicago, Milwaukee and St. Paul Railway opted to route across the Mississippi River into Minnesota at Wabasha rather than Reads Landing. The economy and population of Reads Landing quickly stagnated. Never upgraded or replaced, the school remained in use until 1965.

== Museum ==
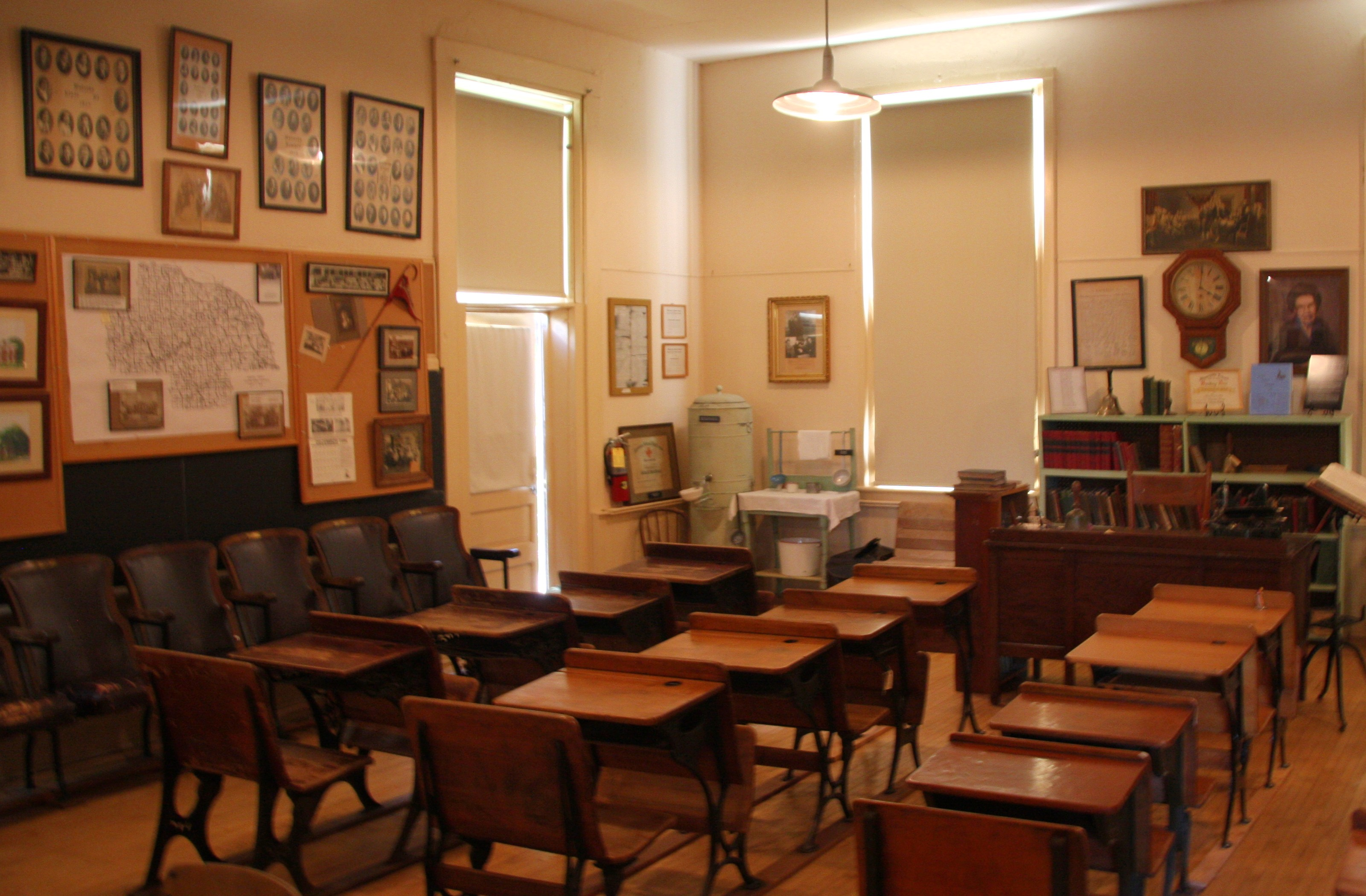
A classroom in the Reads Landing School

The Wabasha County Historical Society operates the Reads Landing School as its primary museum. One classroom is decorated in the style of the 1920s and 30s. Displays include the pulpit and pump organ from Reads Landing's only church, Native American History in Wabasha County, history of railroads in Wabasha County, as well as Agricultural Heritage information.

== See also ==
- List of museums in Minnesota
- National Register of Historic Places listings in Wabasha County, Minnesota
