= Lester Alexander Howatt =

American politician (1909–1994)

Lester Alexande Howatt (August 18, 1909 – October 5, 1994) was an American businessman and politician.

Howatt was born in Wabasha County, Minnesota. He went to University of Minnesota School of Agriculture. Howatt lived in Lake City, Minnesota with his wife and family. He was involved in the banking and real estate businesses and was a farmer. Howatt served on the Lake City School Board and was the school board clerk. He served in the Minnesota House of Representatives im 1965 and 1966. Howatt died in Wabasha County, Minnesota.
