= John F. Hager =

American businessman and politician

John F. Hager (January 8, 1873 – November 2, 1955) was an American businessman and politician.

Born in Frontenac, Goodhue County, Minnesota, Hager moved with his parents to a farm in Maiden Rock, Pierce County, Wisconsin in 1879. Hager went to the Curtis & Rosenburger Business College in Red Wing, Minnesota. In 1900, Hager moved to Whitehall, Trempealeau County, Wisconsin and was involved with a meat market. In 1911, Hager served as Trempealeau County treasurer and was a Republican. He also served as Whitehall village treasurer and served on the Whitehall Village Board. Hager served on the Trempealeau County Board of Supervisors. In 1915 and 1917, Hager served in the Wisconsin State Assembly. He then worked for the People State Bank of Whitehall, the Credit Production Association and the Briggs Transportation Company retiring in 1948. Hager died in Whitehall, Wisconsin after a long illness.
