= Richard R. Lemke =

American politician (1930–2016)

Richard Roland Lamke (July 11, 1930 – October 15, 2016) was an American farmer and politician.

Lemke was born in Red Wing, Minnesota and graduated from Mazeppa High School in Mazeppa, Minnesota. He lived in Lake City, Minnesota with his wife and family and was a farmer. Lemke served on the Mazeppa School Board and was a Democrat. He also served in the Minnesota House of Representatives from 1971 to 1978. Lemke died at the Mayo Clinic Health System Care Center in Lake City, Minnesota.
