= Lake Pepin =

Lake in Minnesota and Wisconsin, US

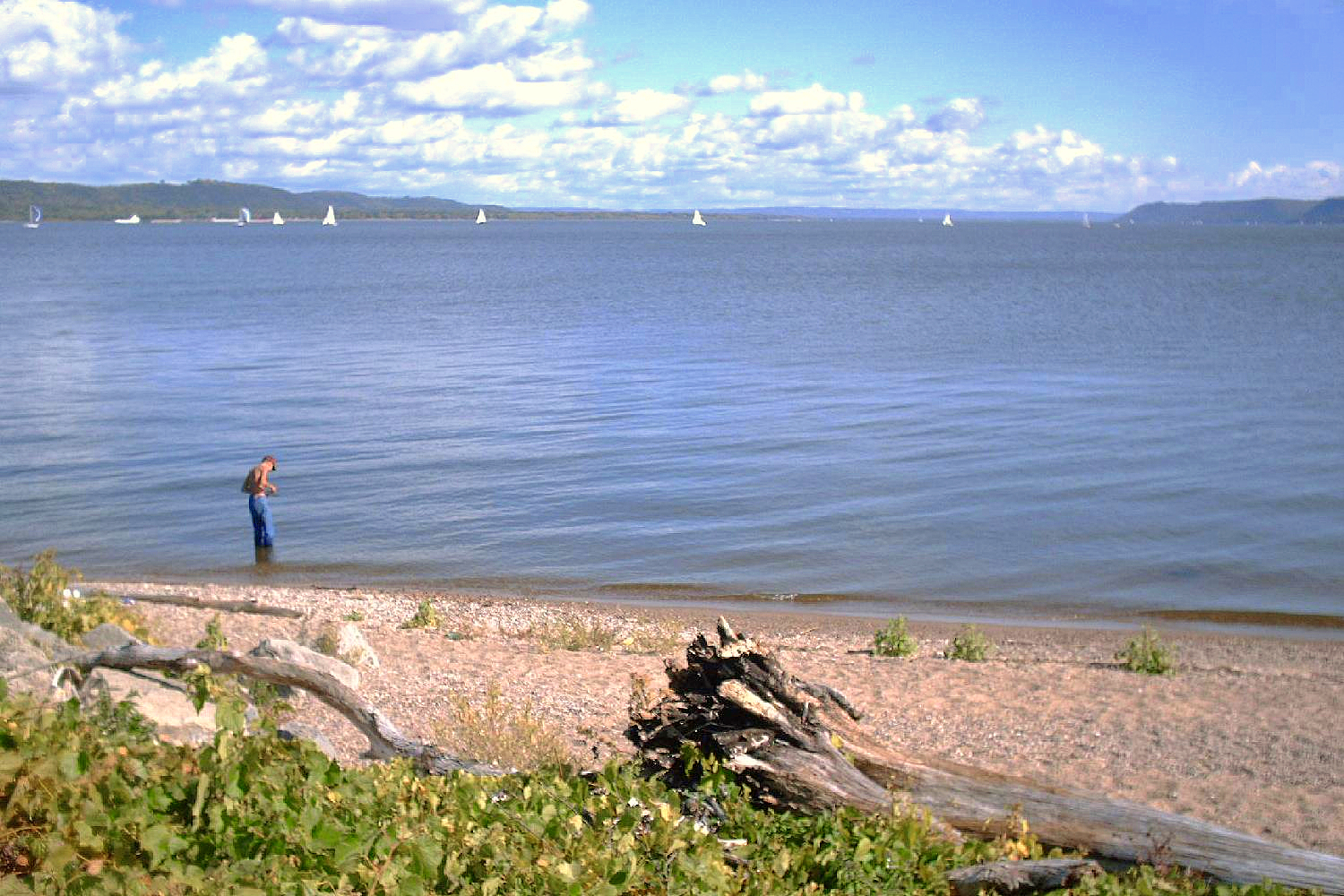
- Lake from the Minnesota side

- Location within Wisconsin
- Location: Goodhue / Wabasha counties in Minnesota and Pepin County, Wisconsin
- Coordinates: 44°29′54″N 92°18′05″W
- Primary inflows: Mississippi River
- Primary outflows: Mississippi River
- Basin countries: United States
- Surface area: 45.7 sq mi (118 km^{2})
- Average depth: 21 ft (6.4 m)
- Max. depth: 60 ft (18 m)
- Surface elevation: 666 ft (203 m)
- Frozen: winter
- Settlements: Lake City, Bay City, Pepin, Maiden Rock, Stockholm, Maple Springs, Camp Lacupolis, Reads Landing

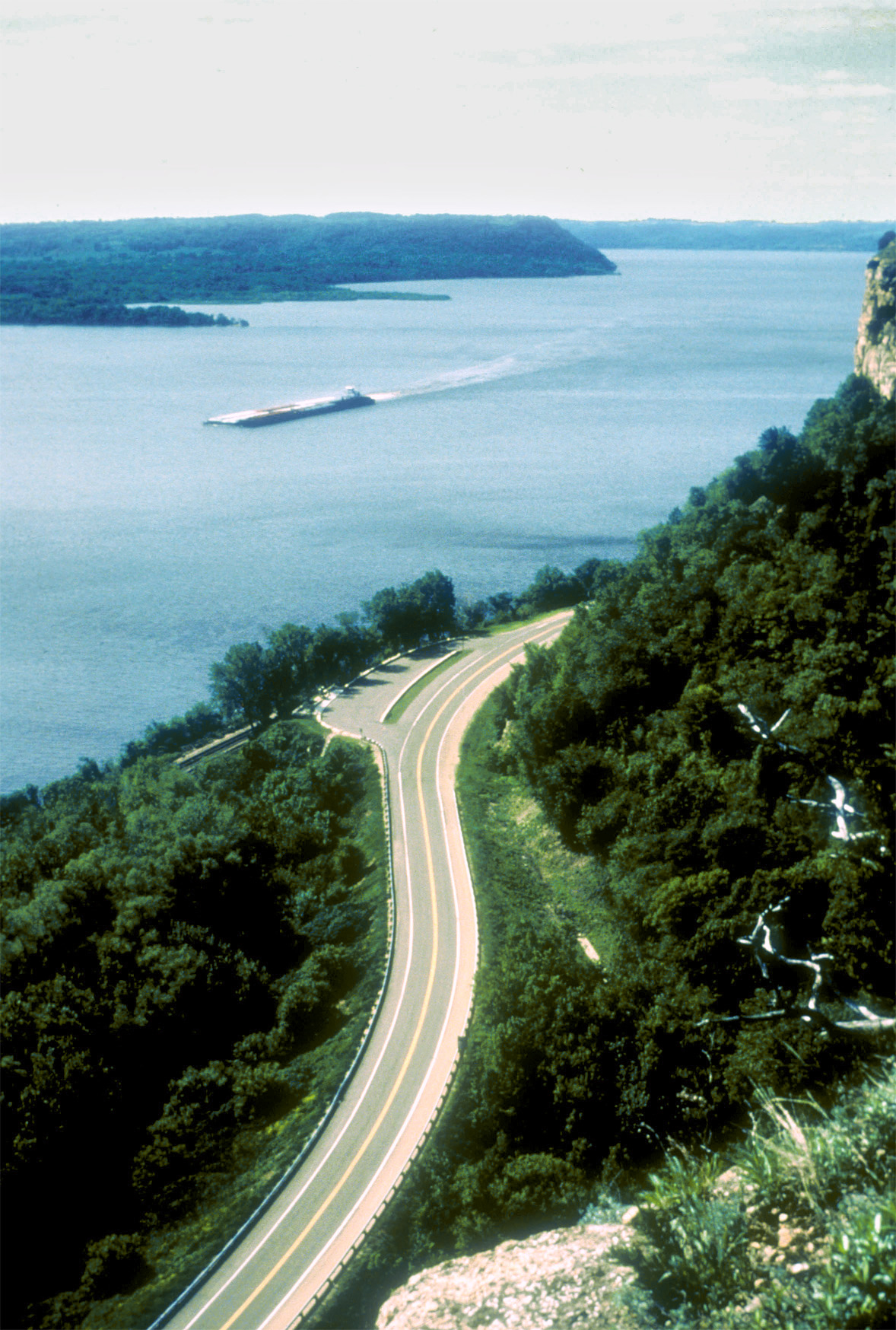
Lake Pepin from Wisconsin side

Lake Pepin (/ˈpɛpɪn/ PEP-in) is a naturally occurring lake on the Mississippi River on the border between the U.S. states of Minnesota and Wisconsin. It is located in a valley carved by the outflow of an enormous glacial lake at the end of the last Ice Age. The lake formed when the Mississippi, a successor to the glacial river, was partially dammed by a delta from a tributary stream and spread out across the ancient valley. It is the 4th largest lake in Wisconsin.

Lake Pepin is now a corridor for water, highway, and rail transportation. Known as the birthplace of water skiing, it hosts a variety of recreational activities.

== Geography ==
Lake Pepin has a surface area of about 40 square miles (100 km^{2}) and an average depth of 21 feet (6.4 m), It is up to 2 miles (3.2 km) wide and 22 miles (35 km) long.

The wide area of the lake stretches from Bay City, Wisconsin, in the north, down to Reads Landing, Minnesota, in the south. The villages of Pepin, Maiden Rock, and Stockholm are on the Wisconsin side, while Frontenac State Park takes up a large part of the Minnesota side. The largest city on the waterfront is Lake City, Minnesota.

The Canadian Pacific Railway now owns the former mainline of the Milwaukee Road on the Minnesota side, and the Burlington Northern's former Burlington Route mainline is lakeside on the Wisconsin side. Both were former racetracks for the premier passenger trains of their owners, and the CP rails still carry Amtrak's Empire Builder between Chicago and the Pacific Northwest and Borealis between Chicago and Saint Paul, MN. Lakeside highways are U.S. Route 61 on the Minnesota side, and across the lake Wisconsin State Highway 35 is just inland from the railroad. Both are National Scenic Byways and parts of the Great River Road.

Maiden Rock, on Lake Pepin, is one site said to be the locale where a Dakota woman named Winona leapt to her death.

== Geology ==
Lake Pepin occupies a valley carved by the waters of Glacial River Warren, which drained Lake Agassiz in a catastrophic flood at the end of the last Ice Age, and to a lesser extent from Lake Duluth, a smaller glacial lake which drained through the present valley of the St. Croix River. When the continental glacier's meltwaters found other outlets to the sea, River Warren was succeeded by the more modest Upper Mississippi, which drains a much smaller basin, and the St. Croix spillway became the present river. Over a long period of time, the deep valley was partially filled with sediments, forming a broad floodplain. In this plain Lake Pepin formed behind a delta comprising sediments deposited into the ancient lake bed by the Chippewa River near the present community of Wabasha at the southern end of the lake. The lake backed up behind this sediment dam as far north as the location of Saint Paul. In the 10,000 years since the lake's creation, ongoing sedimentation into Lake Pepin has caused its upper end to migrate downstream some 80 km (50 mi) to its present location east (river direction south) of Red Wing, Minnesota.

== Ecology ==
The process of sedimentation continues at an accelerated rate; particulates carried by the river upstream are deposited when the current slows where the river empties into the lake. Pepin's natural flora are threatened by these increased rates of sedimentation, leading the Lake Pepin Legacy Alliance to call the phenomenon a "wet desert." Some theorize the lake is filling in at a rate of ten times greater than pre-colonization, due largely to increased run-off from farms along the Minnesota River. Other research maintains sediment accumulation is from a more diverse and complicated series of processes, including natural bank sloughing of large amounts of soil from steep river banks, a result of the geography of the area, composition and physical properties of the soil, man-made restriction of river flooding, access to flood plains and wetlands, and forced straightening an deepening of river channels. Research suggests these processes are being heightened due to increasing precipitation due to climate change.

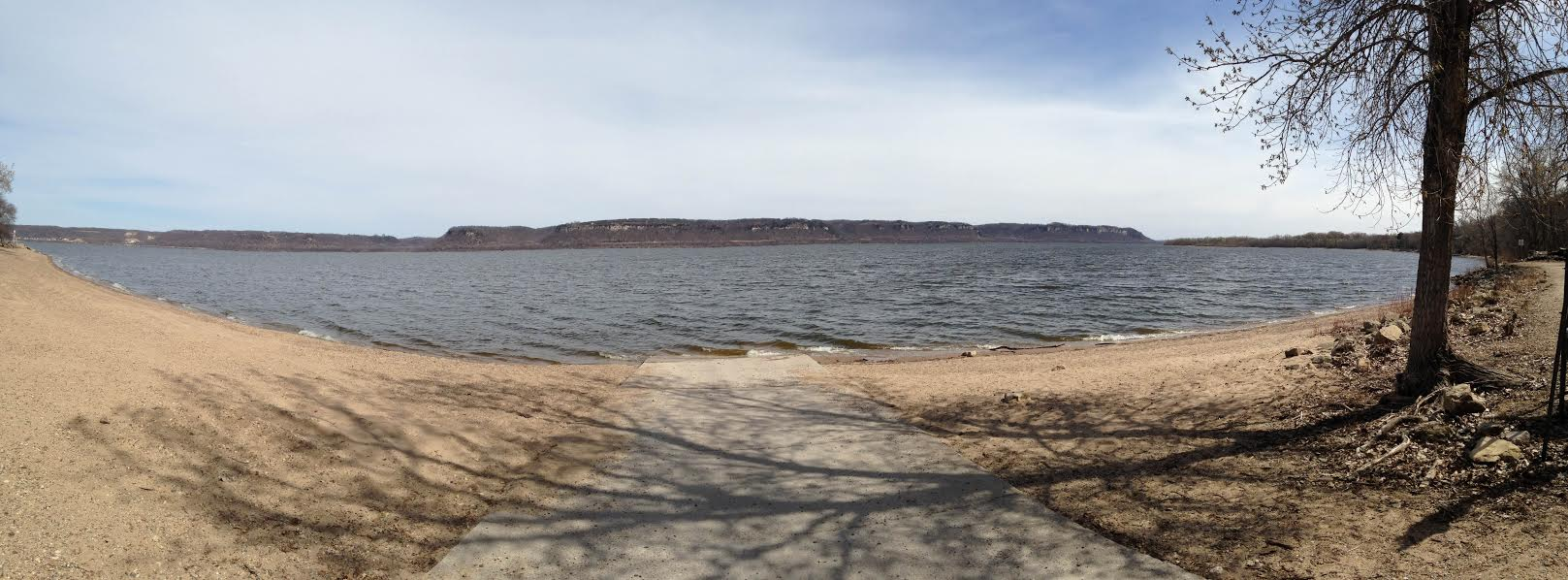
Panoramic view of Lake Pepin from Florence Township's public beach in Frontenac.

== Human history ==
The lake has long been known to the Dakota as Ṭáƞka Bde, which can be translated as the "Great Lake". The lake was considered by some Dakota to be a dwelling place of an Uƞktehi water-spirit. Another Dakota term for the lake is P̣aƞkeska Bde, which can be translated as "White Shell Lake" in reference to mussels found in its waters.

The lake was first named in a map of New France made by Guillaume Delisle at the request of Louis XIV of France in 1703. The lake was named for Jean Pepin who settled on its shores in the late 1600s after exploring the Great Lakes from Boucherville.

Nicolas Perrot erected the first of a number of fur trade posts, Fort Saint Antoine, in 1686. In 1727 René Boucher de La Perrière and Michel Guignas built Fort Beauharnois on the lake. In 1730 it had to be rebuilt on higher ground. Boucher was the military leader and Father Guignas was a missionary to the Sioux.

In the nineteenth century, the lake was used to transport freshly-cut trees for the lumber industry. Cut logs were floated across the lake, from the 1840s often with the assistance of steamboats to counter adverse winds and the sluggish currents in the lake. Large rafts were assembled at Reads Landing at the southern end, and towed downstream to mills at Winona and St. Louis.

In 1890, it was the site of one of the worst maritime disasters on the Mississippi, known as the Sea Wing disaster when the Sea Wing ferry capsized in a bad storm, killing 98 people. In 1922, Lake City native Ralph Samuelson invented the sport of water skiing on the lake, and Lake City is known as "the birthplace of waterskiing." The city celebrates with a festival called Waterski Days every year on the last weekend in June.

== Popular culture ==
Pepin, Wisconsin, is the birthplace of author Laura Ingalls Wilder. In Little House in the Big Woods, the first book in her Little House series, Laura's father visits Lake Pepin in the first chapter and her family visits the lake in the "Going to Town" chapter. Laura's family and their covered wagon then cross the frozen Lake Pepin in the chapter "Going West", the first chapter of the second book, Little House on the Prairie.

== Sources ==
- Ojakangas, Richard W.; Matsch, Charles L (1982). Minnesota's Geology. Minneapolis: University of Minnesota Press. ISBN 0-8166-0953-5.
- Waters, Thomas F. (1977). The Streams and Rivers of Minnesota. Minneapolis: University of Minnesota Press. ISBN 0-8166-0821-0.
