= Carl S. Nygren =

American farmer and politician

Carl S. Nygren (April 3, 1873 – December 3. 1941) was an American farmer and politician.

Nygren was born in Lake City, Minnesota, and went to the local public schools and the University of Minnesota School of Agriculture. He lived with his wife and family on a farm in Lake City, Minnesota and was a farmer and raised livestock. Nygren served in the Minnesota House of Representatives in 1911 and 1921 and was a Democrat.
