= Water table (architecture) =

Architectural element used to deflect water

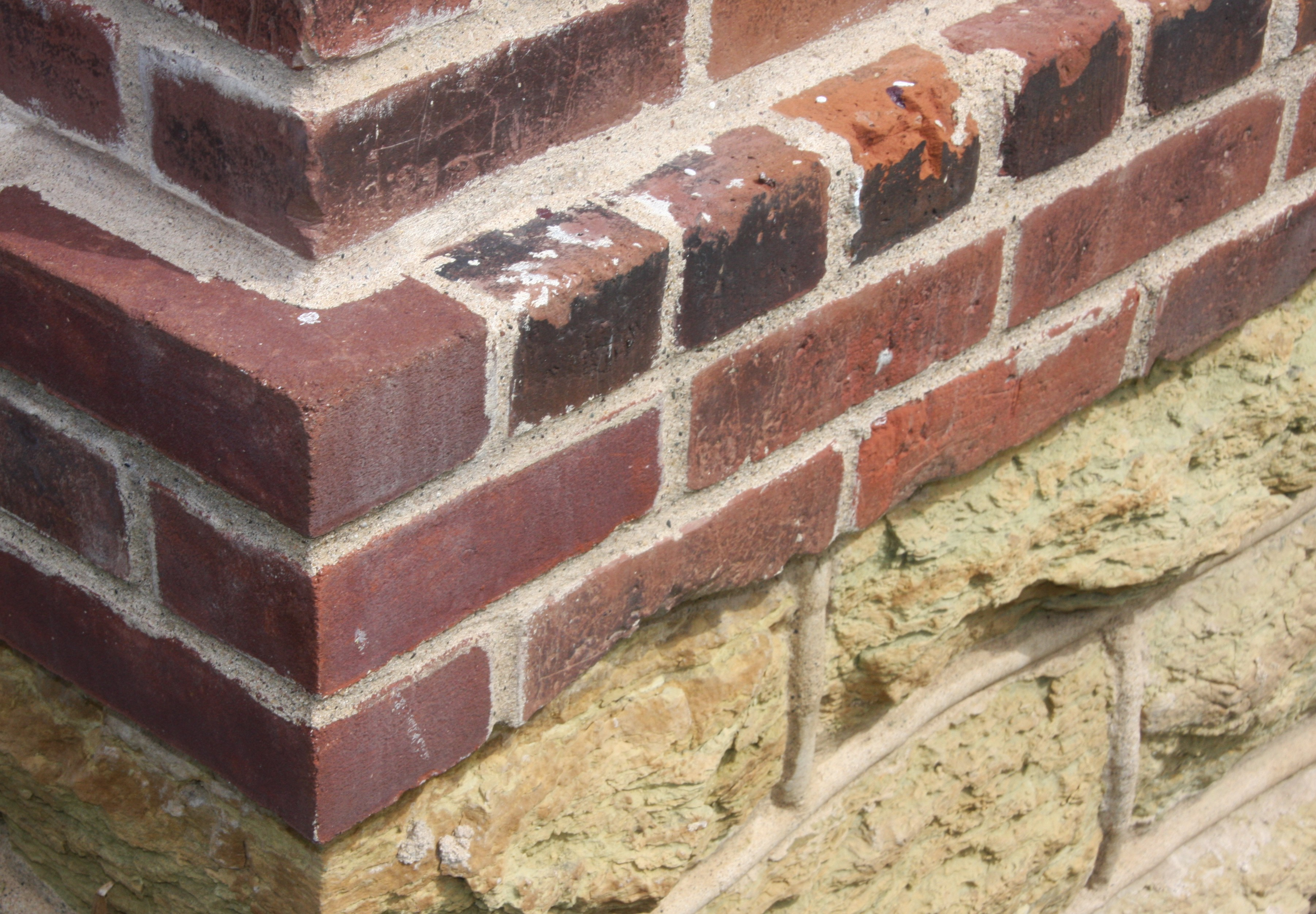
Brick water table at Reads Landing School in Minnesota, US

A water table is a projection of masonry on the lower outside of a wall, slightly above the ground, or at the top of a wainscot section of a wall (in this case also known as a sill).

It is both a functional and architectural feature that consists of a projection that deflects water running down the face of a building away from lower courses or the foundation. A water table may also be primarily decorative, as found near the base of a wall or at a transition between materials, such as from stone to brick. The top of the water table is often sloped or chamfered to throw off water.

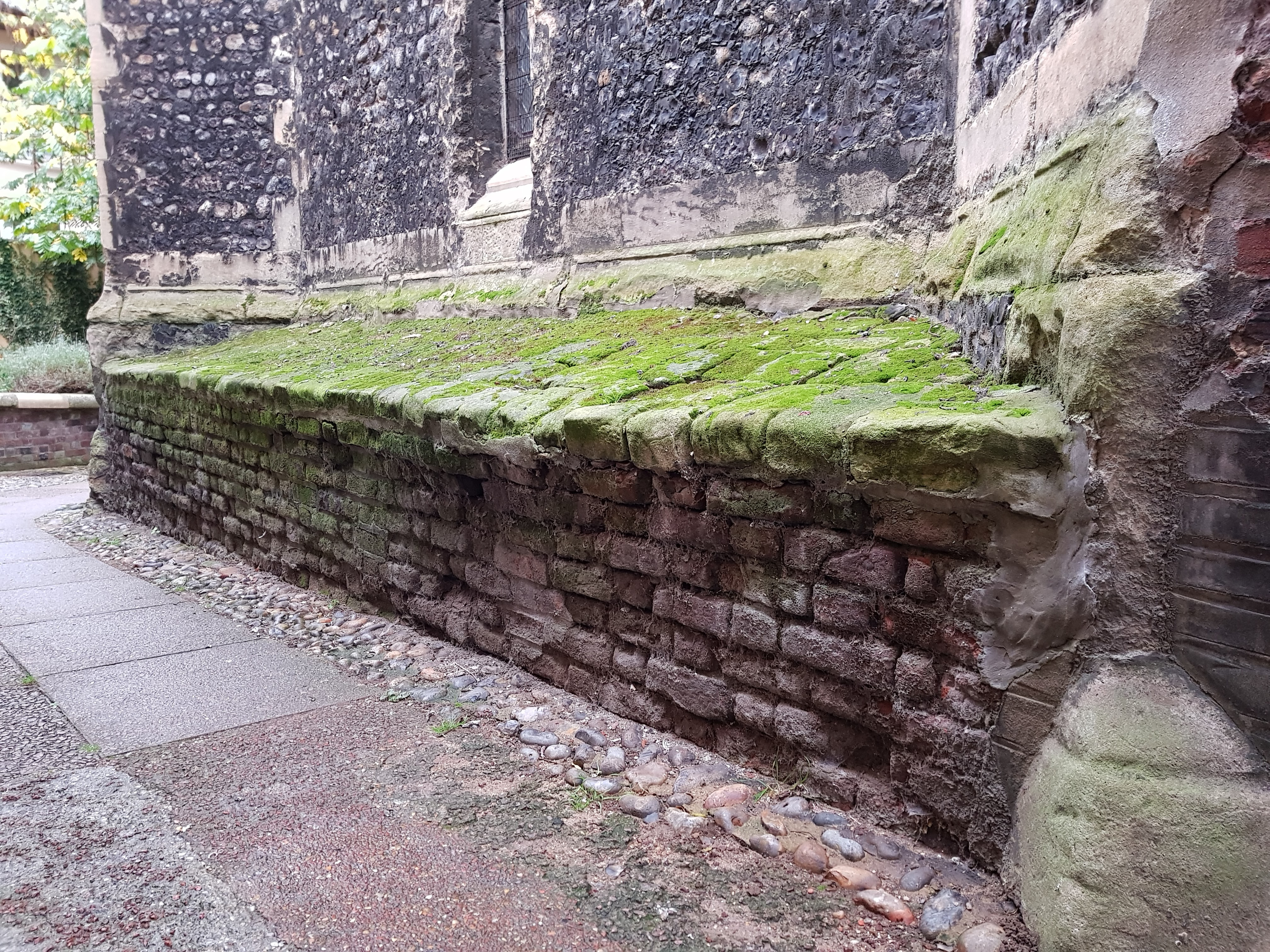
Water table behind St. George's Church, Norwich, Norfolk, England

Often damp proofing is placed at the level of the water table to prevent upward wicking of ground water.

== Bibliography ==
- Parker, John Henry (1888), A Concise Glossary of Architure, London: Parker and Co
