= Frontenac State Park =

State park in Minnesota, United States

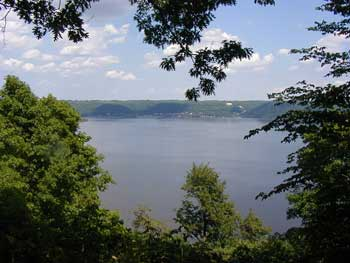
- View of Lake Pepin from Frontenac State Park

- Location within Minnesota Location within the United States
- Location: Goodhue, Minnesota, United States
- Coordinates: 44°30′27″N 92°19′35″W
- Area: 2,270 acres (9.2 km^{2})
- Elevation: 692 ft (211 m)
- Established: 1957
- Governing body: Minnesota Department of Natural Resources

Frontenac State Park

Frontenac State Park is a state park of Minnesota, United States, on the Mississippi River 10 miles (16 km) southeast of Red Wing. The park is notable both for its history and for its birdwatching opportunities. The centerpiece of the park is a 430-foot-high (130 m), 3-mile-long (4.8 km) steep limestone bluff overlooking Lake Pepin, a natural widening of the Mississippi. The bluff is variously called Garrard's Bluff or Point No-Point, the latter name coming from riverboat captains because of the optical illusion that it protruded into the Mississippi River. There is a natural limestone arch on the blufftop called Íƞyaƞ Ṭiyopa, a Dakota name meaning "Stone Door" or "Stone Opening". Park lands entirely surround the town of Frontenac, once a high-class resort at the end of the 19th century.

== Geology ==
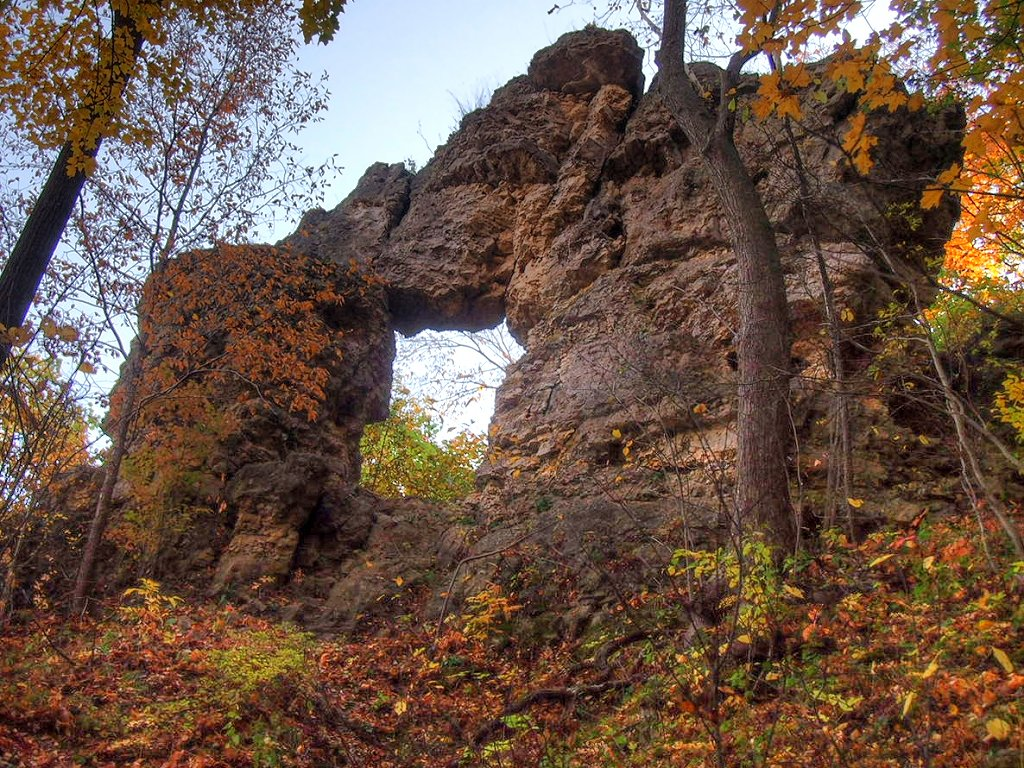
Íƞyaƞ Ṭiyopa, a natural limestone arch atop the bluff in Frontenac State Park

Limestone was laid down 500 million years ago as organic sediments settled to the bottom of a shallow sea that covered much of the Midwest. Much later Glacial River Warren carried torrents of runoff from the melting glaciers of the last ice age. Flowing out of Lake Agassiz, Glacial River Warren carved the Minnesota River valley and the Mississippi River Valley, leaving steep bluffs along the latter's banks. At times Glacial River Warren overflowed its bed and Garrard's Bluff would have been an island. The area is near the northern extreme of the Driftless Area of Minnesota, a region that remained unglaciated during the phases of the last ice age.

In the present day, a creek flows through the eastern end of the park into Lake Pepin. Wells Creek carries substantial amounts of sand eroded out of the nearby hills. As it hits the slow-moving river water, it drops its sediment load, creating a delta and Sand Point, a sand spit jutting perpendicularly out into the lake. Downstream the Chippewa River performs the same action on a larger scale. This sediment blockage is what causes the Mississippi to widen into Lake Pepin.

== Flora ==
The forest on the bluff is a mix of maple, basswood, elm, oak, and aspen. The back of the bluff transitions from this forest to lightly wooden meadows to prairie. The eastern end of the park is a bottomland forest of cottonwood, maple, and willow.

== Fauna ==
The park is home to mammalian species of deer, raccoon, coyote, opossum, red fox, woodchuck, beaver and various ground squirrels. On the Mississippi Flyway, the Frontenac area has been known for birdwatching since 1900. 260 bird species have been sighted in Frontenac State Park. Bald eagles and golden eagles are seen around the bluff. The bottomland forest is excellent habitat for warblers. Sand Point is a popular rest-stop for migrants, including ruddy turnstones and sanderlings. One terrestrial species of note is the timber rattlesnake, though it is rare in the park and only dangerous if provoked.

== History ==
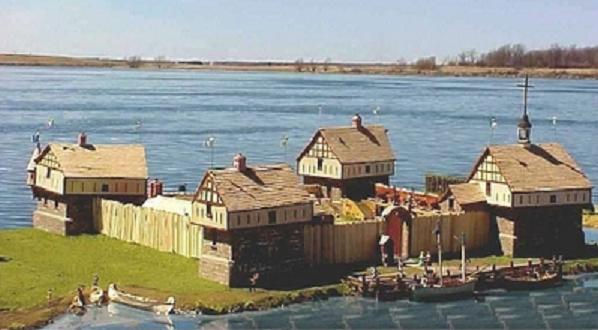
A model of Fort Beauharnois in the Canadian Museum of Civilization

Village sites and burial mounds prove that members of the Hopewell culture were living and dying within the park between 400 BCE and 300 CE. At the beginning of historical times Dakota and Meskwaki people lived in the region. The first Europeans to see this area were Father Louis Hennepin and his exploration party in 1680. In 1727 a party from Montreal led by René Boucher came ashore and built a fort. Fort Beauharnois was intended as a base of operations for trade with the Dakota and for French explorers seeking a route to the Pacific. Ultimately a number of French posts were built on either shore of Lake Pepin until the territory was ceded to Britain after the French and Indian War. Only one of those forts has been located by archaeologists.

The first American settler was James "Bully" Wells, who had a fur trading post near modern Frontenac town by 1840. Later he sold his interests to a Dutch immigrant named Evert Westervelt. However the Dakota were evicted onto reservations, and Westervelt was forced to diversify. He partnered with another settler, Israel Garrard, and established a town in 1857 which he named after himself. Two years later Garrard bought out Westervelt and renamed the town Frontenac, after Louis de Buade de Frontenac who had been governor of New France in the late 17th century. Garrard served in the Civil War, rising to the rank of general. After the war he helped turn Frontenac into a summer resort for the leisure class. His brother Jeptha Garrard was an inventor of flying machines, which were tested, unsuccessfully, from the bluff overlooking the town. Wealthy visitors arrived in Frontenac by steamboat from as far away as New Orleans. Meanwhile, limestone was quarried from the bluff. The Cathedral of St. John the Divine in New York City was constructed of stone from Frontenac. Frontenac's heyday ended when railroads supplanted river travel at the end of the 1800s.

Proposals were made in the 1920s and 30s to protect Garrard's Bluff, Wells Creek, and Sand Point. However serious efforts didn't get underway until a local advocacy group purchased 160 acres (65 ha) in 1955. Their holdings more than doubled the next year when 200 acres (81 ha) of Garrard's Bluff were donated by the chairman of an insurance company. The group lobbied directly to state legislators and other influential people. However other residents of Frontenac were fiercely opposed to a park, fearing that heightened visitation would compromise the town's charm and disturb the wildlife. These concerns were not without merit; at one point there were plans for a "skyline drive" along the blufftop. A bill authorizing the park passed in 1957, with sharp restrictions on recreational development. Purchasing the land from its current owners was similarly contentious. The owner of Sand Point was a particularly adamant holdout, and several tracts had to be acquired through eminent domain. Modest recreational facilities were not installed until the mid-1960s. Land has been added to the park over the years but the minimal-development ethic has been maintained.

== Recreation ==
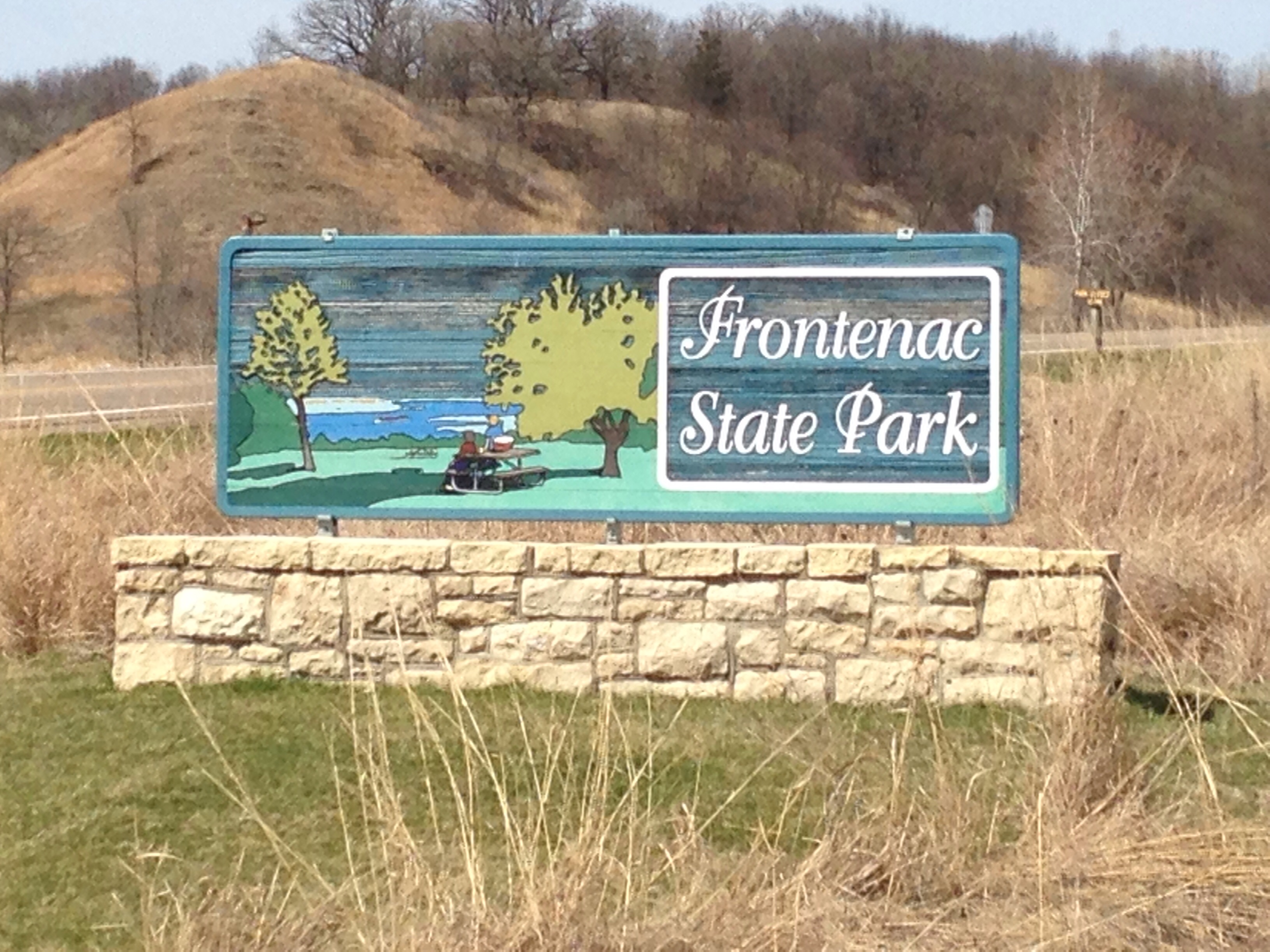
Entrance to the park

- Camping: Atop the bluff there is a campground with 58 sites (19 with electrical hookups) and 6 walk-in campsites.
- Fishing: Walleye, northern pike, crappie, bluegill, and channel catfish can be caught in Lake Pepin.
- Sledding: On the substantial hill behind the park office. Warming hut nearby.
- Swimming: Walk or boat in to Sand Point. Very popular on summer weekends.
- Trails: The park has 13 miles (21 km) of hiking trails. In winter 5.7 miles (9.2 km) are groomed for cross-country skiing and 5.5 miles (8.9 km) for snowmobiling.
  - Bluffview Trail (hiking): An interpretive loop dipping below the blufftop.
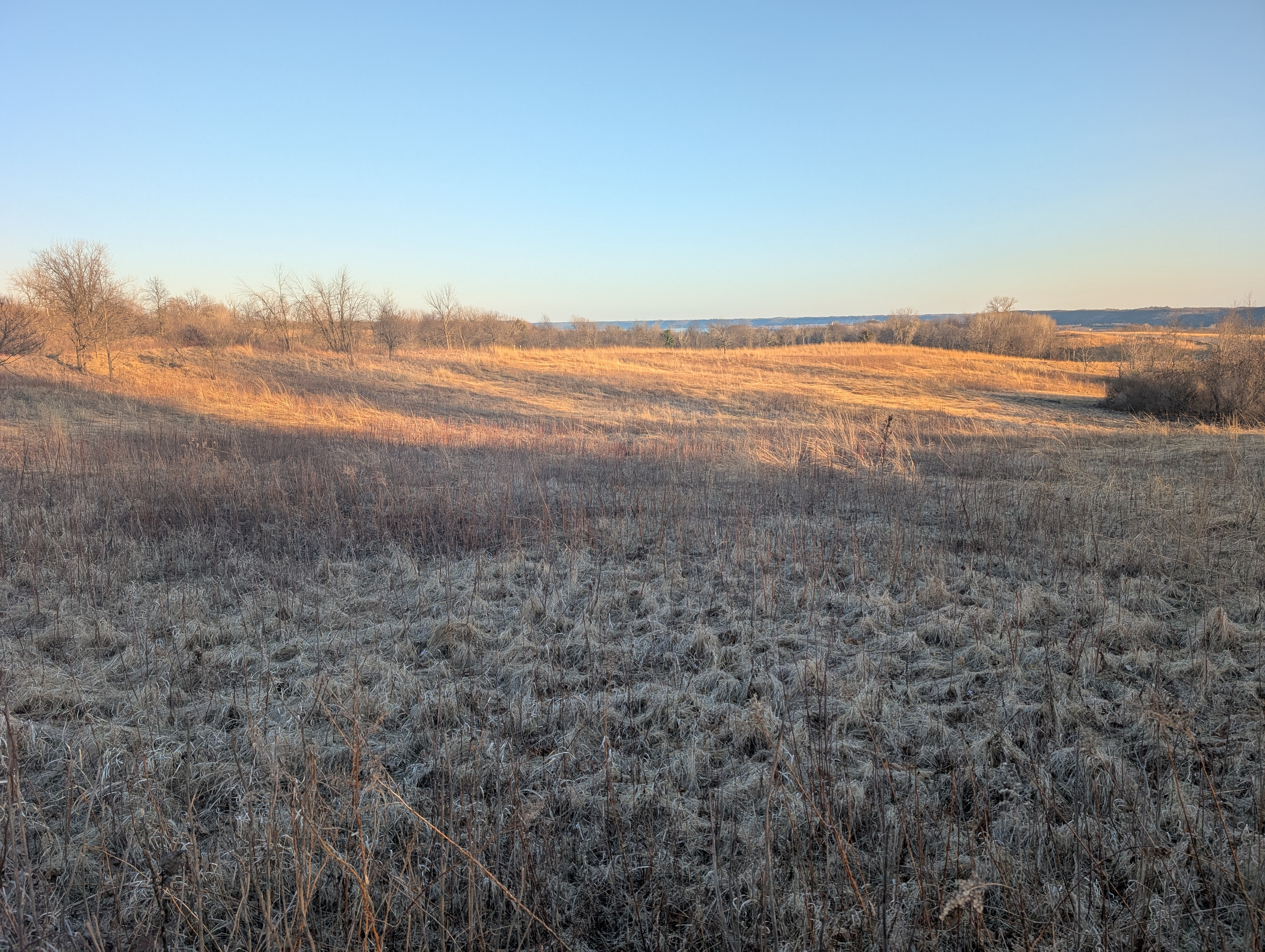
  - A portion of the park's prairies, viewed from the campground area
    Bluffside Trail (hiking): Follows the blufftop to In Yan Teopa and descends in switchbacks to loop back along the bluff's flank. 3 spurs give access to the stony shore. Hiking clockwise is slightly less strenuous.
  - Hill Trail (hiking/snowmobiling): Ascends the meadows and wooded ravines from the park entrance to the campground (1.4 mi).
  - Prairie Trail (hiking/skiing): Loops through prairie and oak savanna past the wooded shore of a small lake (2.7 mi).
  - Sand Point Trail (hiking): Leads from a southern parking area through bottomland forest to Sand Point, the park's best birdwatching zones (0.7 mi).
  - Indian Mound Trail (hiking): A short loop across the highway from the lower parking area, leading past some indistinct burial mounds (0.4 mi).
