= Frontenac, Minnesota =

Unincorporated community in Minnesota, US

Frontenac
- Census-designated place (CDP) and Unincorporated community
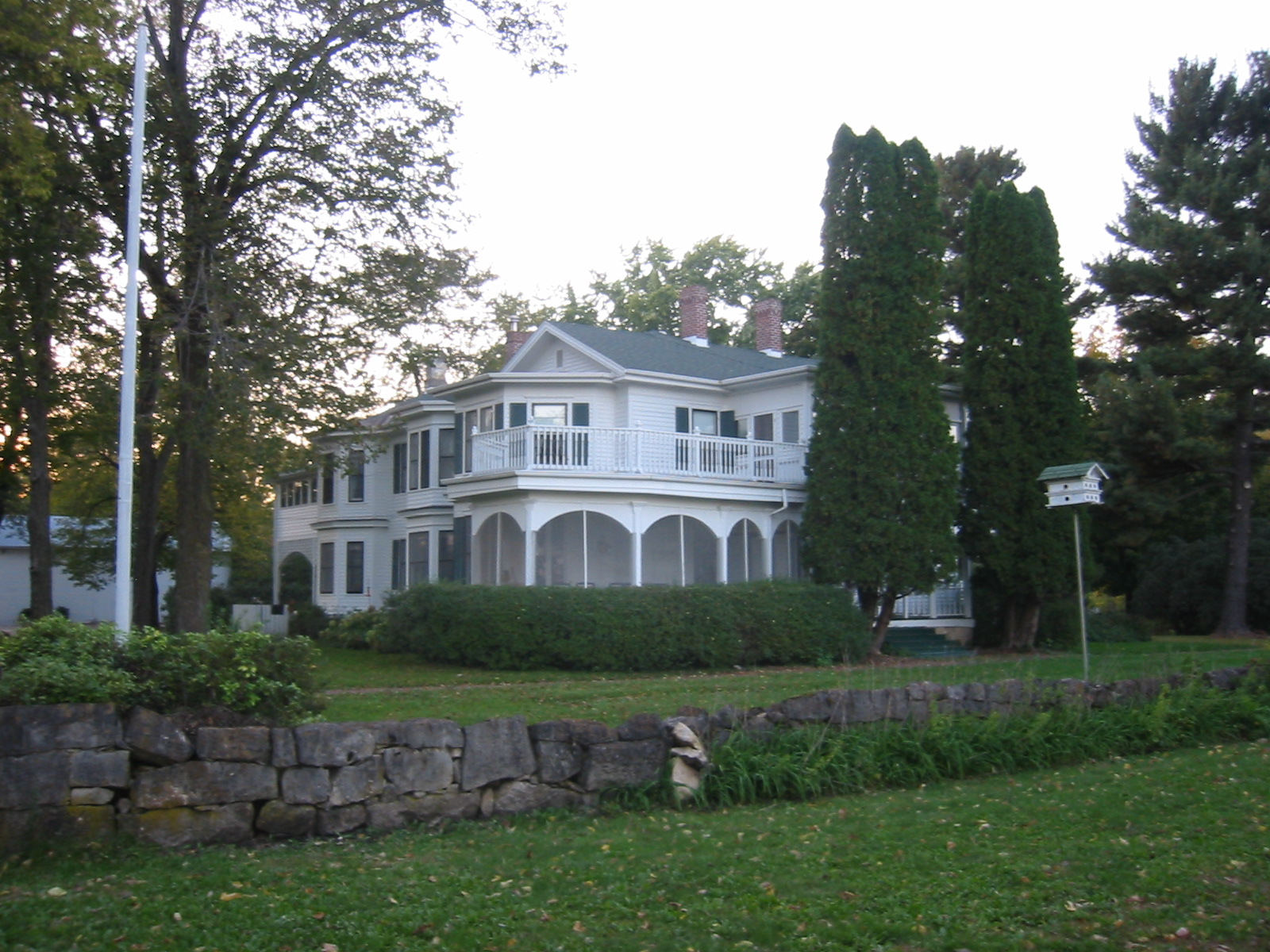
- Winona Cottage, a c. 1854 house from Frontenac's days as a 19th-century resort town

- Location of the community of Frontenac within Florence Township, Goodhue County
- Coordinates: 44°31′26″N 92°19′52″W
- Country: United States
- State: Minnesota
- County: Goodhue County
- Township: Florence Township
- Established: March 5, 1853

Area
  - Total: 1.85 sq mi (4.78 km^{2})
  - Land: 1.85 sq mi (4.78 km^{2})
  - Water: 0.0039 sq mi (0.01 km^{2})
- Elevation: 720 ft (220 m)

Population (2020)
  - Total: 249
  - Density: 135.0/sq mi (52.14/km^{2})
- Time zone: UTC-6 (CST)
  - Summer (DST): UTC-5 (CDT)
- ZIP code: 55026
- Area code: 651
- FIPS code: 27-22904
- GNIS feature ID: 643972

- Old Frontenac Historic District
- U.S. National Register of Historic Places
- U.S. Historic district
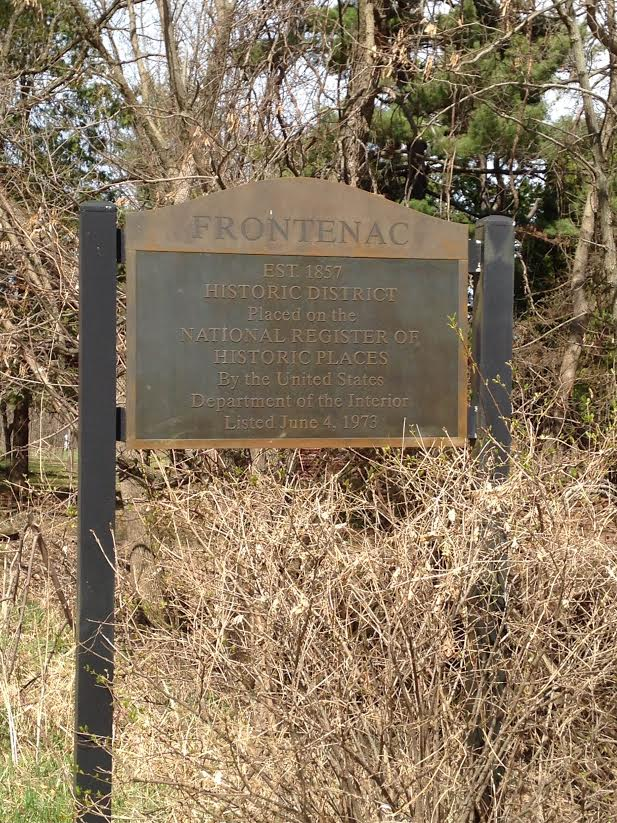
- Sign denoting Frontenac's historic district
- Area: 120 acres (49 ha)
- MPS: Rural Goodhue County MRA (AD)
- NRHP reference No.: 73000978
- Added to NRHP: June 4, 1973

Frontenac (/ˈfrɒtɛnæk/ FRON-teh-nak) is an unincorporated community and census-designated place (CDP) in Florence Township, Goodhue County, Minnesota, United States, on the Mississippi River. As of the 2020 census, its population was 249.

== History ==
James Wells established a trading post in the location that would become Frontenac before 1850. He dealt mostly with Native Americans until the railroad was built in the early 1870s. In 1854, brothers Israel and Lewis Garrard came upon the area during a hunting trip and bought large tracts of land. By 1857, the community was permanently established with the name of Westervelt in 1855 to honor the then postmaster, Evert V. Westervelt. The name was changed to Frontenac in 1860 by the Garrard brothers after Louis de Buade de Frontenac, the French colonial governor of Canada in 1672–82 and 1689–98. There is no record of him actually traveling to the Mississippi River.

The picturesque scenery soon began attracting wealthy residents. It became a community of summer homes with lakeside views. Several hotels were established, including the Lakeside Hotel in 1867. These hotels contributed to Frontenac's reputation as a resort town during the later 19th century.

During the 1870s, a Chicago, Milwaukee, St. Paul and Pacific Railroad line to Frontenac was established; however, as the founders would not sell land to the railway company, the line was established some distance away from town. The railway ran from north to south and connected the remote area to larger cities, but it was far enough away from the bluffs not to detract from the vacation destination. A new community sprang up around the railway station, and later the highway, called Frontenac Station; the original townsite was then dubbed Old Frontenac. Both are in Florence Township and are listed as one location in the U.S. Census.

== Geography ==
According to the United States Census Bureau, Frontenac has an area of 1.846 miles (2.971 km); 1.844 miles (2.968 km) of this is land, and 0.002 miles (0.0032 km) is water.

== Demographics ==
Historical population
| Census | Pop. | Note | %± |
|---|---|---|---|
| 1880 | 104 | | — |
| 2010 | 282 | | — |
| 2020 | 249 | | −11.7% |
U.S. Decennial Census

At the 2010 United States census, there were 282 people in 114 households in Frontenac. (Note: The 2010 United States census only included Frontenac Station.)

== Religion ==
St John Lutheran Church is a Christian church of the Wisconsin Evangelical Lutheran Synod in Frontenac. Christ Episcopal Church is also located in Old Frontenac, and features an outdoor amphitheater.

== Attractions ==
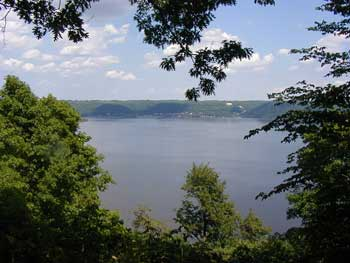
Mississippi River from nearby Frontenac State Park

=== Mount Frontenac Ski and Golf ===
The Mount Frontenac Ski Resort was located on the north-western edge of Frontenac Station. It had 17 named runs, 6 lifts, and 80 acres (320,000 m^{2}) of skiable area. Its longest run was 4,000 feet (1,200 m) in length. The ski runs have been closed and are now part of an 18-hole golf course.

=== Frontenac State Park ===
The land between Frontenac Station and Old Frontenac, as well as much of the land to the north and some to the south, was set aside as a State Park in 1957. Frontenac State Park includes the floodplain along the Mississippi River, bluffs which are a flyway for many migratory bird species, prairies and hardwood forests. It is within the Mississippi Flyway and is also part of the Driftless Area of the north central United States.

== Transportation ==
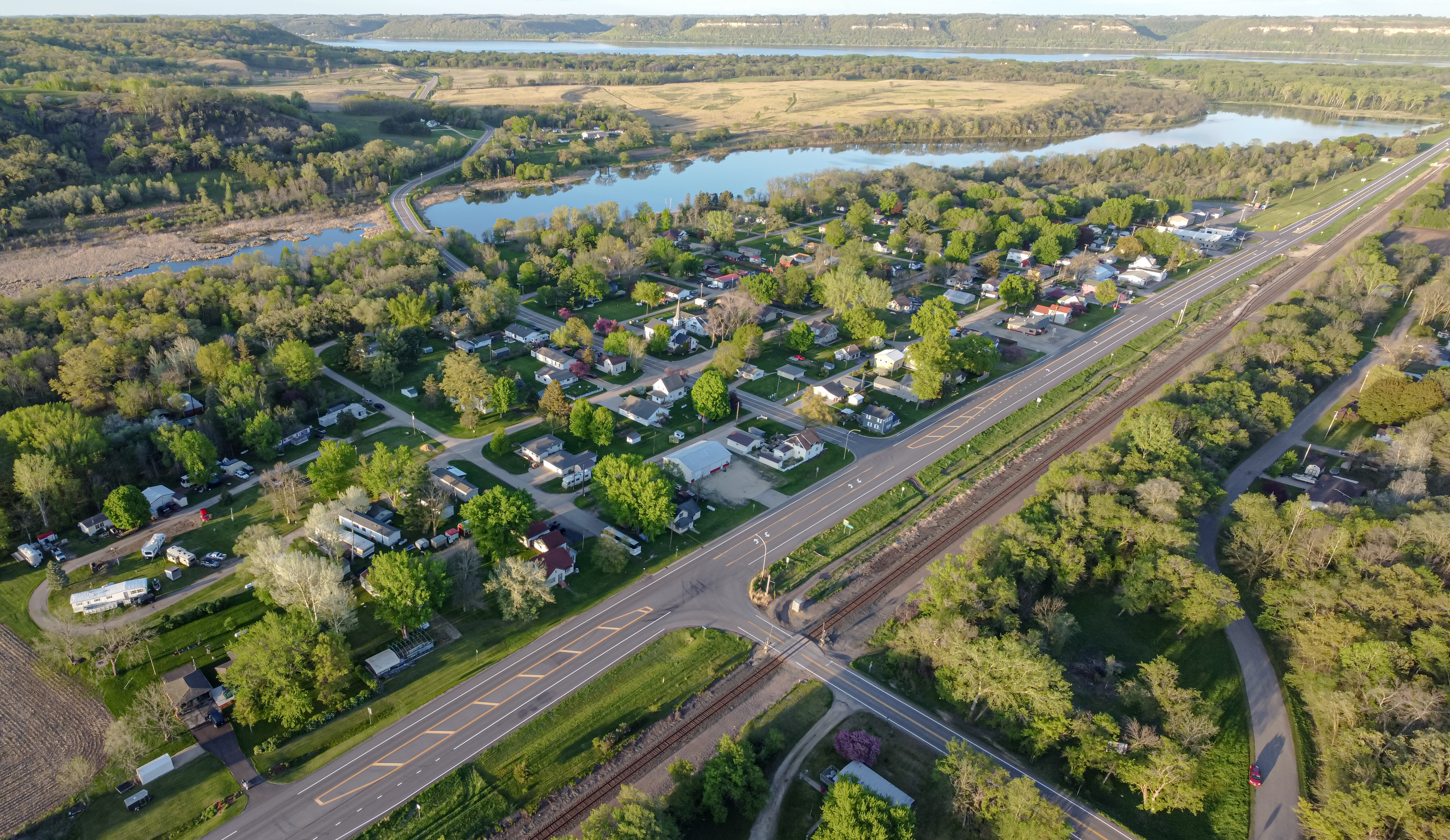
US-61/63 and the Canadian Pacific Railway run through the town.

Frontenac is located along U.S. Highway 61, which also carries U.S. Highway 63 at that point.

Amtrak’s Empire Builder, which operates between Seattle/Portland and Chicago, passes through the town on BNSF tracks, but makes no stop. The nearest station is located in Red Wing, 10 miles (16 km) to the northwest.

The Frontenac Airport is located 1 mi (1.6 km) south of Frontenac Station, and is administered by a private agency.

== Notable person ==
- John F. Hager, Wisconsin State Assemblyman and businessman, was born in Frontenac.

== See also ==
- Minnesota Historical Society
- National Register of Historic Places (Goodhue County)
