= Lake City, Minnesota =

City in Minnesota, United States

Lake City
- City
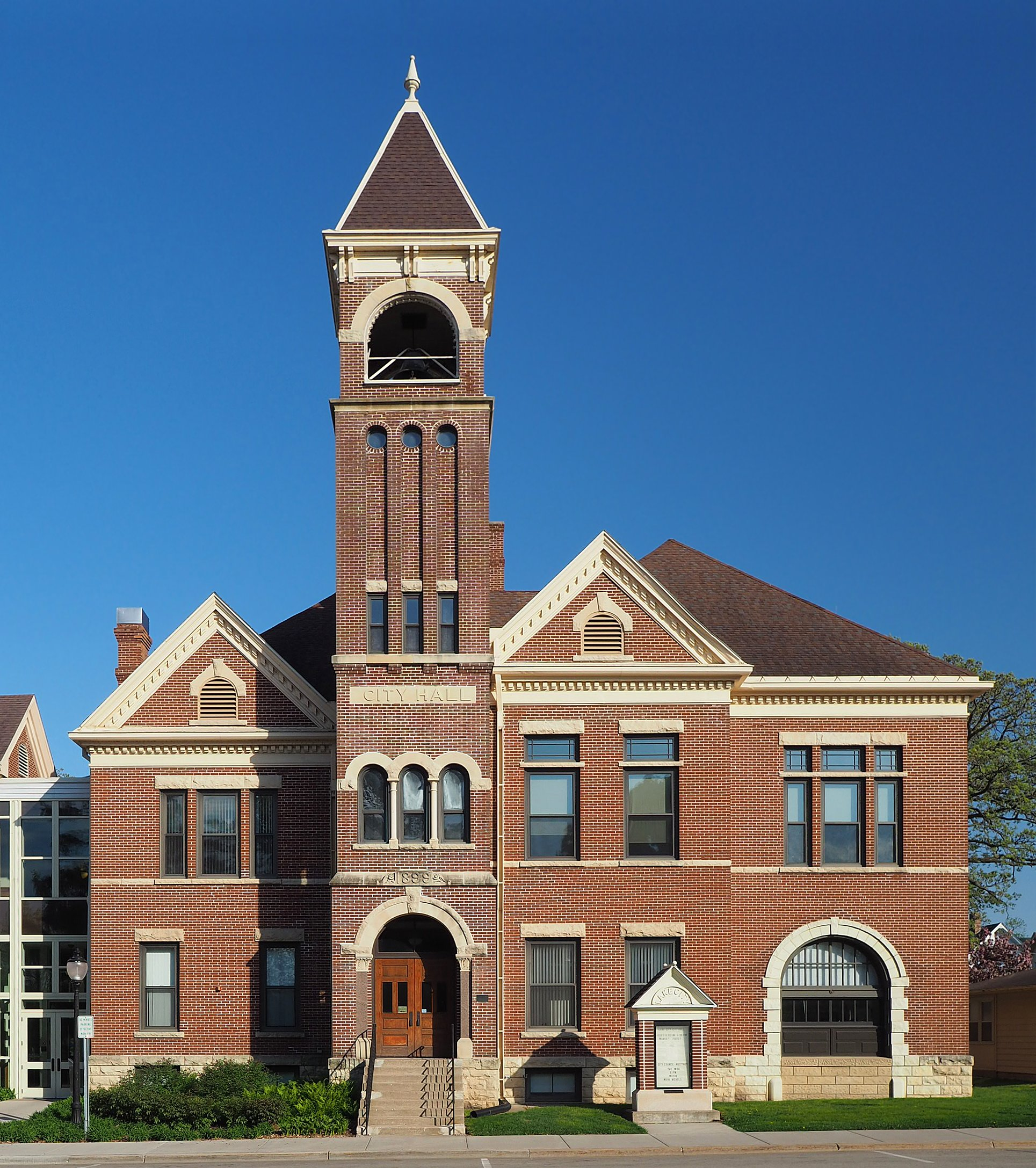
- Historic wing of the Lake City City Hall, built in 1899
- Nickname: "The Birthplace of Waterskiing"
- Motto: "What You Need When You Need It"
- Location of Lake City within Wabasha County in the state of Minnesota
- Coordinates: 44°26′44″N 92°16′14″W
- Country: United States
- State: Minnesota
- Counties: Wabasha, Goodhue

Area
  - Total: 4.49 sq mi (11.64 km^{2})
  - Land: 4.48 sq mi (11.60 km^{2})
  - Water: 0.015 sq mi (0.04 km^{2})
- Elevation: 690 ft (210 m)

Population (2020)
  - Total: 5,252
  - Density: 1,172.6/sq mi (452.74/km^{2})
- Time zone: UTC-6 (Central (CST))
  - Summer (DST): UTC-5 (CDT)
- ZIP code: 55041
- Area code: 651
- FIPS code: 27-34172
- GNIS feature ID: 0646338
- Website: ci.lake-city.mn.us

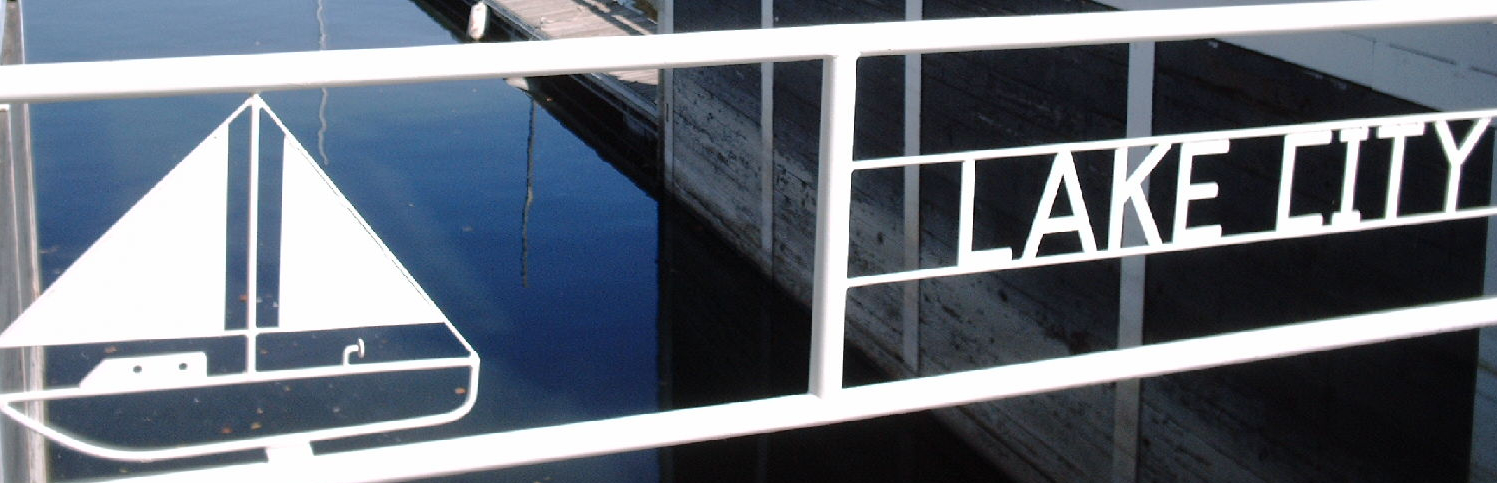
Gate at the Lake City Marina

Lake City is a city in Goodhue and Wabasha counties in the U.S. state of Minnesota. It lies along Lake Pepin, a wide portion of the Mississippi River. The population was 5,252 at the 2020 census. Most of Lake City is located within Wabasha County with only a small portion in Goodhue County. Lake City is part of the Rochester, Minnesota, metropolitan statistical area.

== History ==
Lake City is located 65 miles (105 km) southeast of the Twin Cities at the intersection of U.S. Highways 61 and 63 on the Mississippi River at Lake Pepin. Lac de Pleurs (Lake of Tears) was the name given to Lake Pepin by Father Louis Hennepin, who camped on the shore of the lake in 1680. He christened the large body of water Lac de Pleurs after observing his Sioux captors weeping near the lake over the death of a chief's son. The war party of Isanti Sioux had captured Hennepin and his two companions several miles south along the Mississippi and were camping near the lake on their return north to their Sioux villages near present-day Mille Lacs.

The first known settler was Jacob Boody, who arrived in 1853. In the years to follow, several explorers passed through this area. The town was platted in 1855. The waters of Lake Pepin are deep enough to allow for a port, and in 1864 the Lake City town supervisors were given special powers by the Minnesota Legislature to create a port market for grain. Soon after, Lake City became noted as a profitable market for grain, with the volume of trade in 1866 bringing in a little over a million and a half dollars.

Lake City became incorporated in 1872 and has become widely known for its attractive surroundings and bountiful fishing. The Sea Wing disaster occurred on July 13, 1890 when a strong squall line overturned the excursion vessel Sea Wing on Lake Pepin near Lake City. Over 200 people were aboard the vessel when it was overturned, and as a result 98 people drowned.

Water skiing was invented in Lake City by area resident Ralph Samuelson, which he first performed on Lake Pepin during the summer of 1922. To commemorate this event, Lake City has adopted the nickname "The Birthplace of Water Skiing" and holds an annual town festival, called Water Ski Days. Water Ski Days typically includes three days of water skiing exhibitions, live music, beer garden, street carnival, sports tournaments, and a parade; it is held annually during the last full weekend in June.

Lake City has three properties listed on the National Register of Historic Places: the 1872 James C. and Agnes M. Stout House, the 1899 Lake City City Hall, and the 1910 Williamson–Russell–Rahilly House.

== Geography ==
According to the United States Census Bureau, the city has a total area of 4.56 square miles (11.81 km^{2}); 4.50 square miles (11.65 km^{2}) is land and 0.06 square miles (0.16 km^{2}) is water. U.S. Highways 61 and 63 are two of the main routes in the community.

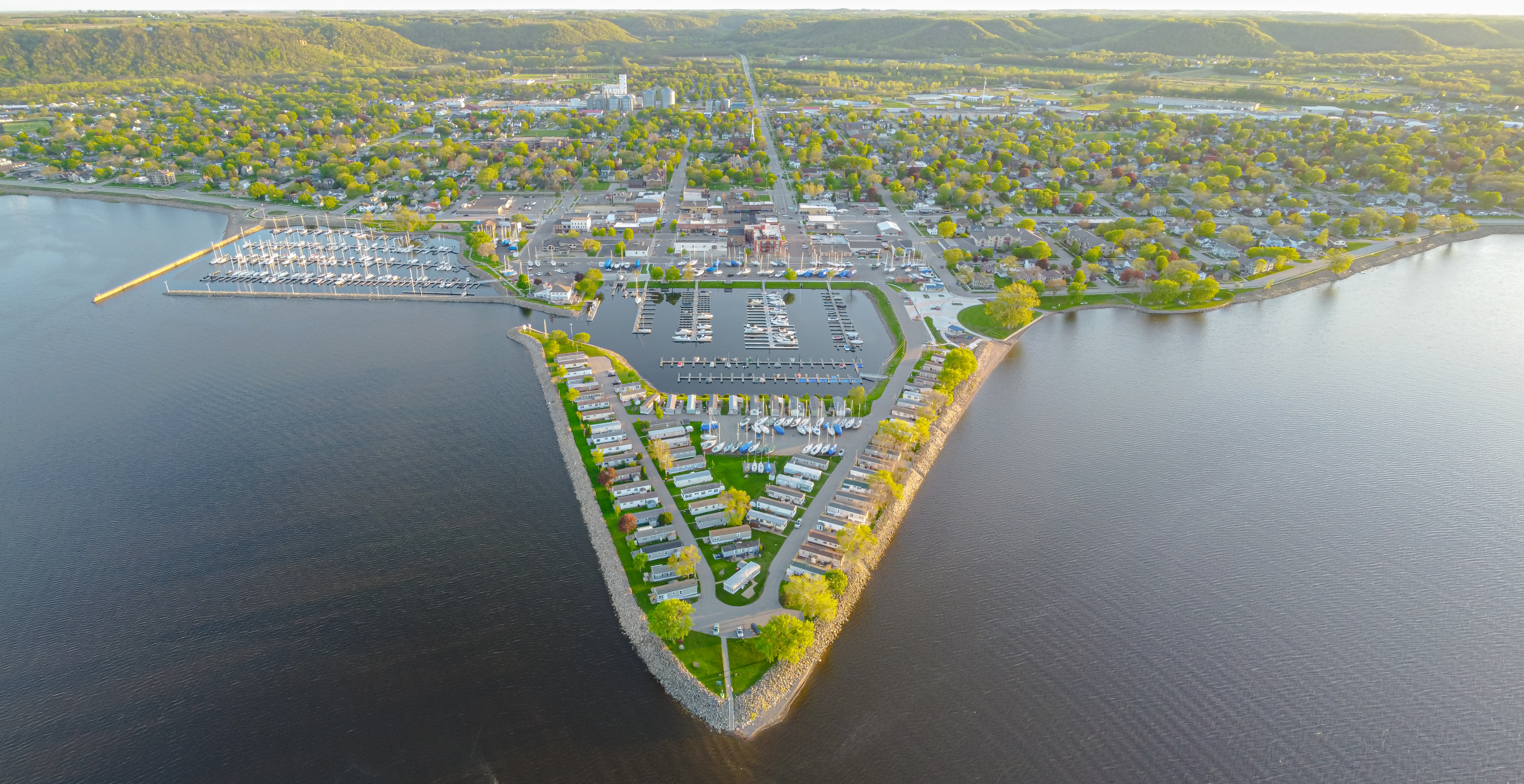
Lake City, Minnesota on Lake Pepin

== Demographics ==
Historical population
Census	Pop.	Note	%±
1880	2,596		—
1890	2,128		−18.0%
1900	2,744		28.9%
1910	3,142		14.5%
1920	2,846		−9.4%
1930	3,210		12.8%
1940	3,204		−0.2%
1950	3,457		7.9%
1960	3,494		1.1%
1970	3,594		2.9%
1980	4,505		25.3%
1990	4,391		−2.5%
2000	4,950		12.7%
2010	5,063		2.3%
2020	5,252		3.7%
U.S. Decennial Census

Historical population
Census	Pop.	Note	%±
1880	112		—
2020	5,252		—
U.S. Census for Central Point

=== 2020 census ===
As of the 2020 census, Lake City had a population of 5,252. The median age was 49.8 years. 19.6% of residents were under the age of 18 and 29.4% of residents were 65 years of age or older. For every 100 females there were 92.4 males, and for every 100 females age 18 and over there were 88.3 males age 18 and over.

93.5% of residents lived in urban areas, while 6.5% lived in rural areas.

There were 2,350 households in Lake City, of which 22.0% had children under the age of 18 living in them. Of all households, 46.6% were married-couple households, 18.3% were households with a male householder and no spouse or partner present, and 28.6% were households with a female householder and no spouse or partner present. About 35.1% of all households were made up of individuals and 19.2% had someone living alone who was 65 years of age or older.

There were 2,790 housing units, of which 15.8% were vacant. The homeowner vacancy rate was 1.2% and the rental vacancy rate was 8.2%.

Racial composition as of the 2020 census
Race	Number	Percent
White	4,845	92.3%
Black or African American	36	0.7%
American Indian and Alaska Native	13	0.2%
Asian	30	0.6%
Native Hawaiian and Other Pacific Islander	1	0.0%
Some other race	125	2.4%
Two or more races	202	3.8%
Hispanic or Latino (of any race)	228	4.3%

=== 2010 census ===
As of the census of 2010, there were 5,063 people, 2,238 households, and 1,428 families living in the city. The population density was 1,125.1 inhabitants per square mile (434.4/km^{2}). There were 2,687 housing units at an average density of 597.1 per square mile (230.5/km^{2}). The racial makeup of the city was 99.3% White, 0.5% African American, 0.3% Native American, 0.8% Asian, 0.3% from other races, and 0.7% from two or more races. Hispanic or Latino of any race were 0.2% of the population.

There were 2,238 households, of which 24.4% had children under the age of 18 living with them, 51.3% were married couples living together, 8.3% had a female householder with no husband present, 4.2% had a male householder with no wife present, and 36.2% were non-families. 30.6% of all households were made up of individuals, and 15% had someone living alone who was 65 years of age or older. The average household size was 2.20 and the average family size was 2.72.

The median age in the city was 46.2 years. 20.2% of residents were under the age of 18; 6.7% were between the ages of 18 and 24; 21.8% were from 25 to 44; 27.7% were from 45 to 64; and 23.7% were 65 years of age or older. The gender makeup of the city was 48.1% male and 51.9% female.

=== 2000 census ===
As of the census of 2000, there were 4,950 people, 2,131 households, and 1,402 families living in the city. The population density was 1,166.9 inhabitants per square mile (450.5/km^{2}). There were 2,347 housing units at an average density of 553.3 per square mile (213.6/km^{2}). The racial makeup of the city was 96.81% White, 0.63% African American, 0.40% Native American, 1.11% Asian, 0.28% from other races, and 0.77% from two or more races. Hispanic or Latino of any race were 2.22% of the population.

There were 2,131 households, out of which 26.7% had children under the age of 18 living with them, 56.0% were married couples living together, 7.4% had a female householder with no husband present, and 34.2% were non-families. 29.2% of all households were made up of individuals, and 14.7% had someone living alone who was 65 years of age or older. The average household size was 2.30 and the average family size was 2.83.

In the city, the population was spread out, with 22.8% under the age of 18, 6.4% from 18 to 24, 26.1% from 25 to 44, 24.8% from 45 to 64, and 19.9% who were 65 years of age or older. The median age was 41 years. For every 100 females, there were 93.1 males. For every 100 females age 18 and over, there were 89.9 males.

The median income for a household in the city was $40,637, and the median income for a family was $47,146. Males had a median income of $35,321 versus $24,799 for females. The per capita income for the city was $20,944. About 3.2% of families and 6.0% of the population were below the poverty line, including 7.7% of those under age 18 and 5.1% of those age 65 or over.

== Education ==
Lake City is the home of Bluffview Elementary, a K–6 public elementary school, Lincoln High School for grades 7–12 (public), and St. John's Lutheran School, a K–8 Lutheran School of the WELS. Previously, the town also was home to a Catholic School named St. Mary's.

== Transportation ==
Amtrak’s Empire Builder, which operates between Seattle/Portland and Chicago, passes through the town on BNSF tracks, but makes no stop. The nearest station is located in Red Wing, 17 miles (27 km) to the northwest.

== City services ==
=== Public safety ===
Lake City is served by full-time police and ambulance services that are city operated, and a paid on-call fire department serves the city, surrounding rural areas, and waters of Lake Pepin.

=== Library ===
The Lake City Public Library, located at 201 South High Street, is a member of Southeastern Libraries Cooperating, which "provide services and support to public, school, academic, and special libraries in an 11 county region of Southeastern Minnesota."

== Media ==
=== Radio ===
FM radio stations
Frequency	Call sign	Name	Format	Owner
94.9	KLCH	Lake Hits 95	Oldies	Q Media Group, LLC.

== Notable people ==
- Randy Breuer, National Basketball Association player
- Fritz Cronin, National Football League player
- Mary Pat Gleason, actress
- Taylor Heise, ice hockey player
- Lester Alexander Howatt, Minnesota state representative
- John Kobs, athletics coach
- Richard R. Lemke, Minnesota state representative
- Mark McKenzie, film composer
- Carl S. Nygren, Minnesota state representative
- Ralph Samuelson, inventor of water skiing
