= Mount Pleasant =

Mount Pleasant may refer to:

== Places ==
=== Australia ===
- Mount Pleasant (Australian Capital Territory), a hill
- Mount Pleasant, New South Wales, a suburb in the city of Wollongong
- Mount Pleasant, Cranebrook, New South Wales, a housing estate
- Mount Pleasant, Queensland (Mackay Region), a mountain and suburb of Mackay
- Mount Pleasant, Queensland (Moreton Bay), a mountain and locality, part of the D'Aguilar Range
- Mount Pleasant, South Australia, a town
- Mount Pleasant, Western Australia, a suburb of Perth
- Mount Pleasant, Victoria, a suburb of Ballarat

=== Canada ===
- Mount Pleasant, Calgary, Alberta, a neighbourhood
- Mount Pleasant, Vancouver, British Columbia, a neighbourhood
- Mount Pleasant, Nova Scotia (disambiguation)
- Mount Pleasant, Ontario (disambiguation)
- Mount Pleasant, Prince Edward Island, a rural community
- Rural Municipality of Mount Pleasant No. 2, Saskatchewan
- Mount Pleasant Caldera, a volcano in New Brunswick

=== United Kingdom ===
- Mount Pleasant henge, Dorset, England
- Mount Pleasant, Barcombe, East Sussex, England
- Mount Pleasant, Batley, West Yorkshire, England
- Mount Pleasant, Buckinghamshire, England
- Mount Pleasant, Cambridge, Cambridgeshire, England
- Mount Pleasant, Cornwall, England
- Mount Pleasant, Idridgehay, Site of Special Scientific Interest in Derbyshire, England
- Mount Pleasant, Liverpool, Merseyside, England
- Mount Pleasant, Merthyr Tydfil, Wales
- Mount Pleasant, Newhaven, East Sussex, England
- Mount Pleasant, Spennymoor, County Durham, England
- Mount Pleasant, Staffordshire, a place in Staffordshire, England
- Mount Pleasant, Stockton-on-Tees, County Durham, England
- Mount Pleasant, Swansea, Wales
- Mount Pleasant, Warwickshire, England
- Mount Pleasant Mail Centre, Clerkenwell, London, the largest sorting office operated by Royal Mail

=== United States ===
- Mount Pleasant, Arkansas
- Mount Pleasant, Delaware
- Mount Pleasant (Smyrna, Delaware)
- Mount Pleasant, Florida
- Mount Pleasant, Evans County, Georgia
- Mount Pleasant, Wayne County, Georgia
- Mount Pleasant, Delaware County, Indiana
- Mount Pleasant, Johnson County, Indiana
- Mount Pleasant, Martin County, Indiana
- Mount Pleasant, Perry County, Indiana
- Mount Pleasant, Iowa
- Mount Pleasant, Kansas
- Mount Pleasant, Kentucky (disambiguation)
- Mount Pleasant, Maryland
- Mount Pleasant, Frederick County, Maryland
- Mt. Pleasant (Woodstock, Maryland)
- Mount Pleasant (Union Bridge, Maryland)
- Mount Pleasant (Upper Marlboro, Maryland)
- Mount Pleasant (Newton, Massachusetts)
- Mount Pleasant, Michigan
- Mount Pleasant, Mississippi
- Mount Pleasant, Missouri
- Mount Pleasant, St. Louis, Missouri
- Mount Eisenhower, a New Hampshire mountain known as Mount Pleasant until 1970
- Mount Pleasant, New Jersey (disambiguation)
- Mount Pleasant, New York, a town
- Mount Pleasant (Indian Falls, New York), a historic farm
- Mount Pleasant, Ulster County, New York, a populated place
- Mount Pleasant (Ulster County, New York), a mountain
- Mount Pleasant, North Carolina
- Mount Pleasant, Cleveland, a neighborhood in Ohio
- Mount Pleasant, Ohio
- Mount Pleasant, Vinton County, Ohio
- Mount Pleasant, Pennsylvania, a borough
- Mount Pleasant, Bucks County, Pennsylvania
- Mount Pleasant, Providence, Rhode Island
- Mount Pleasant, South Carolina
- Mount Pleasant, Tennessee
- Mount Pleasant, Texas
- Mount Pleasant, Utah
- Mount Pleasant (Hague, Virginia)
- Mount Pleasant, Frederick County, Virginia
- Mount Pleasant (Staunton, Virginia)
- Mount Pleasant (Strasburg, Virginia)
- Mount Pleasant, Washington, D.C.
- Mount Pleasant, Green County, Wisconsin, a town
- Mount Pleasant, Wisconsin, village in Racine County
- Mount Pleasant Township (disambiguation)
- Mount Pleasant, Saint Croix, U.S. Virgin Islands
- Mount Pleasant, Saint John, U.S. Virgin Islands

=== Elsewhere ===
- Mountpleasant railway station, County Louth, Ireland
- Mount Pleasant, New Zealand, a suburb of Christchurch
  - Tauhinukorokio / Mount Pleasant, the Christchurch hill on which the suburb is placed
- Mount Pleasant, Harare, Zimbabwe
- Mount Pleasant (constituency), a parliamentary constituency in Zimbabwe

== Arts and entertainment ==
- Mount Pleasant (film), a 2006 Canadian film directed by Ross Weber
- Mount Pleasant (TV series), a British comedy-drama television programme airing on Sky1
- Mount Pleasant (EP), 2025 EP by Kelsea Ballerini
- "Mount Pleasant", a song from Conquest by Dragon Fli Empire
- Mount Unpleasant, a 1999 album by Moka Only and Deceo Ellipsis

== Other uses ==
- Frank Mount Pleasant (1884–1937), Native American football player, track and field athlete, and college coach of football, basketball, and baseball
- Mount Pleasant F.A., a football club based in Jamaica
- Mount Pleasant (cricket ground), a cricket ground in Batley, Yorkshire
- Mount Pleasant (mansion), a mansion in Philadelphia, Pennsylvania
- Mount Pleasant, Sheffield, an 18th-century mansion in Sheffield, England
- Mount Pleasant Group of Cemeteries, Ontario
- Mount Pleasant Cemetery, Toronto, Ontario
- Mount Pleasant Road, a street in Toronto, Ontario
- Mount Pleasant High School (disambiguation)
- Mount Pleasant School (disambiguation)
- Mount Pleasant Radio Observatory, Tasmania, Australia
- Mount Pleasant station (disambiguation), various railway stations
- Mount Pleasant Winery, Augusta, Missouri
- RAF Mount Pleasant, a British military base in the Falkland Islands
- RCAF Station Mount Pleasant, Prince Edward Island, Canada

== See also ==
- Mount Pleasant Commercial Historic District (disambiguation)
- Mount Pleasant Historic District (disambiguation)
- Pleasant Mountain, Maine, US
