= General Howard (disambiguation) =

Oliver Otis Howard (1830–1909) was a Union Army major general. General Howard may also refer to:

== United Kingdom ==
- Charles Howard (British Army officer) (c. 1696–1765), British Army general
- Charles Howard, 1st Earl of Carlisle (1628–1685), English Army lieutenant general
- Francis Howard (British Army officer, born 1848) (1848–1930), British Army major general
- Francis Howard, 1st Earl of Effingham (1683–1743), British Army lieutenant general
- Geoffrey Howard (British Army officer) (1876–1966), British Army lieutenant general
- George Howard (British Army officer) (1718–1796), British Army general
- John Howard, 15th Earl of Suffolk (1739–1820), British Army general
- Kenneth Howard, 1st Earl of Effingham (1767–1845), British Army lieutenant general
- Thomas Howard (British Army officer, born 1684) (1684–1753), British Army lieutenant general
- Thomas Howard, 2nd Earl of Effingham (1714–1763), British Army lieutenant general

== United States ==
- Archie F. Howard (1892–1964), U.S. Marine Corps major general
- Benjamin Howard (Missouri politician) (1760–1814), U.S. Army brigadier general
- Benjamin Chew Howard (1791–1872), Maryland Militia brigadier general
- Edwin B. Howard (1901–1993), U.S. Army brigadier general
- Harold Palmer Howard (1866–1951), U.S. Army brigadier general
- James H. Howard (1913–1995) U.S. Air Force brigadier general
- Michael L. Howard (1980s–2020s), U.S. Army lieutenant general
- Russell D. Howard (fl. 1970s–2000s), U.S. Army brigadier general
- Samuel L. Howard (1891–1960), U.S. Marine Corps general

== See also ==
- Patrick Howard-Dobson (1921–2009), British Army general
- Edward Howard-Vyse (1905–1992), British Army lieutenant general
- Richard Howard-Vyse (1883–1962), British Army major general
- John Eager Howard (1752–1827), declined commission as a U.S. Army brigadier general
- Attorney General Howard (disambiguation)
