= Mount Pleasant, United States Virgin Islands =

Mount Pleasant, United States Virgin Islands

- Mount Pleasant, Saint Croix, United States Virgin Islands
- Mount Pleasant, Saint John, United States Virgin Islands
