= Williamson–Russell–Rahilly House =

Historic house in Minnesota, United States

- Williamson-Russell-Rahilly House
- U.S. National Register of Historic Places
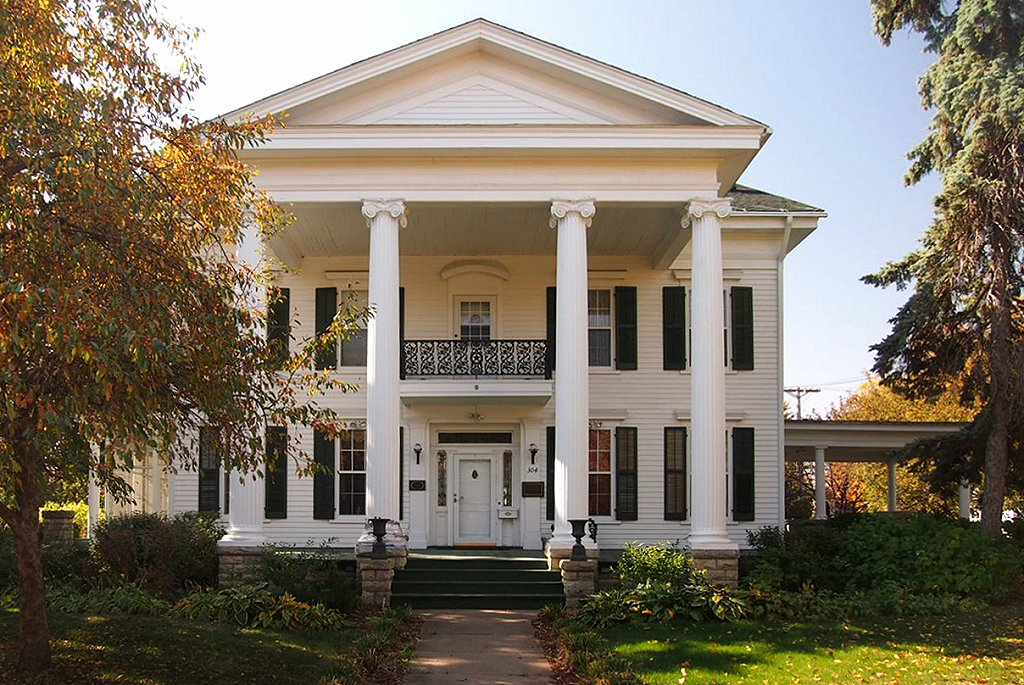
- The Williamson–Russell–Rahilly House from the northeast

- Location within Minnesota Location within the United States
- Location: 304 Oak Street, Lake City, Minnesota
- Coordinates: 44°26′46.5″N 92°15′59″W
- Area: Less than one acre
- Built: c. 1868, remodeled 1910
- Built by: John Stout (1868), Charles A. Koch (1910)
- Architectural style: Greek Revival/Neoclassical
- NRHP reference No.: 84001709
- Designated: March 8, 1984

The Williamson–Russell–Rahilly House is a historic house in Lake City, Minnesota, United States. The original core of the house was built in Greek Revival style around 1868, but it was extensively remodeled in Neoclassical style in 1910. The house was listed on the National Register of Historic Places in 1984 for having local significance in the theme of architecture. It was nominated as a particularly fine example of Minnesota's elegant, turn-of-the-20th-century architecture.

== Description ==
The original core of the Williamson–Russell–Rahilly House is a two-story frame building. The symmetrical façade has a centrally placed front door flanked by engaged columns, and both stories have windows with cornice moldings. The side elevations have gables with the traditional open pediments of Greek Revival architecture. There were originally shallow porches over the front and side doors.

The 1910 remodeling removed the original porches and added much larger elements. Most prominent is a two-story portico with a fully pedimented gable supported by four Ionic order columns. The side entrance received a porte-cochère, while the southeast elevation gained a screened-in porch. On a small balcony over the front door is a wrought-iron balustrade with an Étoile du Nord motif that originally adorned the Alexander Ramsey House in Saint Paul, Minnesota. A one-story extension was also appended to the rear of the house.

== History ==
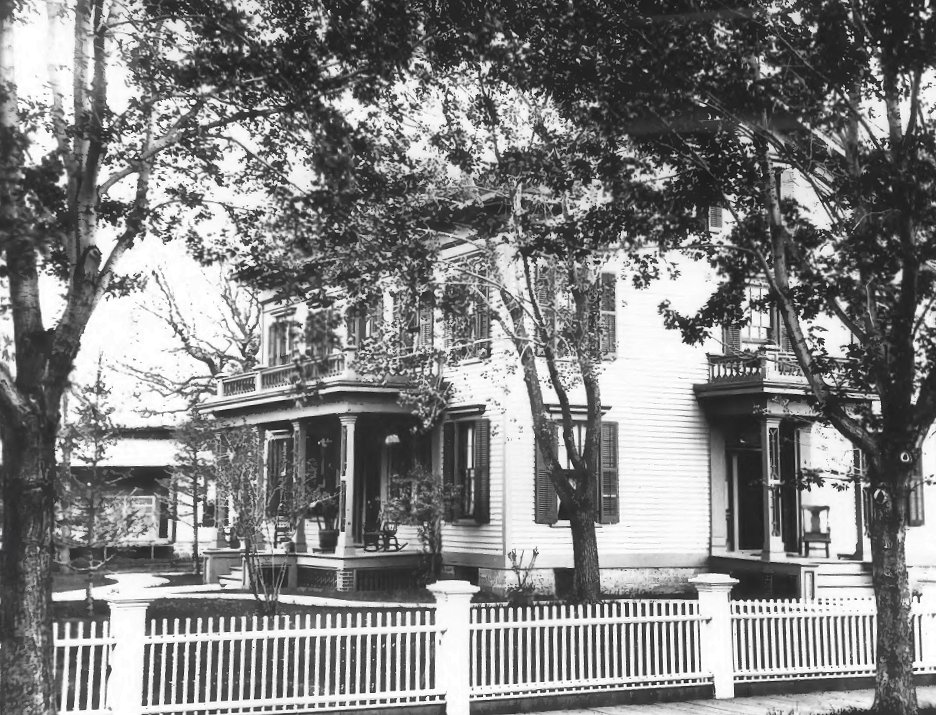
The house circa 1900 before its Neoclassical remodeling

The first house on this site was built in 1855 for Samuel Doughty, one of Lake City's three original founders. Two years later he sold the house to Harvey Williamson, the city's first postmaster. In 1868, however, it burned down in a fire, so Williamson hired carpenter John Stout to rebuild over the original foundation. Williamson and his family lived in the new home until 1882, when they sold it to Morris C. Russell, editor of Lake City's first newspaper. Russell had arrived in Minnesota Territory in 1854 as a 14-year-old orphaned by a cholera outbreak that killed hundreds aboard their steamboat. He served as a scout during the Dakota War of 1862 and moved to Lake City in 1881, where he began publishing the Graph-Sentinel newspaper.

Russell's residency was apparently brief because tax records show the house in the hands of Lyman and Melissa Buck as of 1882. The Bucks were partners in the Seely & Buck dry goods store, with Melissa continuing in the business after Lyman died in 1890. She likely died around 1900, for that was when her daughter sold the house to its fourth owner, Patrick Henry Rahilly.

Rahilly was a prominent farmer and politician. Born in 1832 in Ireland, he emigrated to the United States with his parents in 1849 and arrived in Minnesota Territory in the 1850s. He settled in Wabasha County in 1868, establishing a farm near Lake City in Mount Pleasant Township. Six years later he entered politics, ultimately being elected thrice to the Minnesota House of Representatives and once to the state senate. His 1880 farmhouse is also on the National Register of Historic Places. Around 1900 he purchased the Williamson–Russell House from Jennie Buck to serve as a place to stay when in town. In 1910 his wife died, prompting Rahilly to sell his farmhouse to his daughter and her husband and to move permanently into the Lake City house.

That same year Rahilly contracted with Charles A. Koch, a self-taught local architect, to renovate the Greek Revival house into a Neoclassical mansion. Rahilly died in the home on January 12, 1931, at the age of 98. It stayed in the Rahilly family as a summer home until 1963. That year it was purchased by George W. Enz, a singer who had performed in the Ziegfeld Follies.

== See also ==
- National Register of Historic Places listings in Wabasha County, Minnesota
