= Mount Pleasant, U.S. Virgin Islands =

Mount Pleasant, U.S. Virgin Islands may refer to:

- Mount Pleasant, Saint Croix, U.S. Virgin Islands
- Mount Pleasant, Saint John, U.S. Virgin Islands
