= Edwin Howard =

Edwin Howard may refer to:

- Ted Howard (politician) (Edwin John Howard, 1868–1939), New Zealand politician
- Edwin Howard (architect) (1896-1982), American architect
- Edwin Alfred Howard (1922–1942), United States Marine awarded the Silver Star
- Edwin B. Howard (1901–1993), American general
