= Mount Pleasant, Indiana =

Mount Pleasant, Indiana may refer to:

- Mount Pleasant, Delaware County, Indiana
- Mount Pleasant, Martin County, Indiana
- Mount Pleasant, Johnson County, Indiana
- Mount Pleasant, Perry County, Indiana
