= Mount Pleasant micropolitan area =

The Mount Pleasant micropolitan area may refer to:

- The Mount Pleasant, Michigan micropolitan area, United States
- The Mount Pleasant, Texas micropolitan area, United States

== See also ==
- Mount Pleasant (disambiguation)
