= Cawood Ledford =

American sports announcer

Cawood Ledford (April 24, 1926 – September 5, 2001) was a radio play-by-play announcer for the University of Kentucky basketball and football teams. Ledford's style and professionalism endeared himself to many sports fans in the Commonwealth of Kentucky and, more than two decades after his death, he remains among the most popular sports figures in the state. Ledford is widely regarded as one the top broadcasters in the history of American sport.

A native of Harlan, Kentucky, Ledford was educated at Hall High School and Centre College in Danville, Kentucky. He began broadcasting high school basketball and football games for WHLN radio in Harlan in 1951 and began broadcasting Kentucky Wildcats games in 1953 after moving to Lexington. He remained in his position of play-by-play announcer for University of Kentucky basketball for 39 years. His last game as an announcer for a Kentucky basketball game was in 1992, when Kentucky fell to Duke 104–103 in overtime in the NCAA East Regional Final, a game widely considered to be the greatest college basketball game ever played. In a gesture of appreciation, Duke head coach Mike Krzyzewski walked to the broadcast area shortly after the game's conclusion and congratulated Ledford on his career.

Ledford distinguished himself with rare versatility, excelling as a play-by-play announcer in basketball, football, and horse racing. In addition to calling games for Kentucky, he worked as the play-by-play announcer for national radio broadcasts of the NCAA Men's Final Four on the CBS Radio Network and called many runnings of the Kentucky Derby for CBS Radio. Ledford also announced broadcasts of basketball games of the Kentucky Colonels, a successful American Basketball Association franchise.

== Style and sayings ==
Ledford's play-by-play style was known for its technical prowess, excellent command of the English language and colloquialisms, enunciative quality, gentility, timeliness, humor, and rapid but unhurried delivery. Listeners to his basketball radio broadcasts found that he was able to paint an extremely detailed visual picture of the game and call the action as it happened without sounding rushed. Fans observe that Ledford rarely let a call "lag" behind the action (e.g., when the sound of the crowd cheering is heard before the announcer comments on the game's action). Ledford's voice was generally higher pitched and mildly nasal, which allowed for clear enunciation. However, the tonal quality of his voice was smokey and resonant, which balanced a subtle twang and provided his listeners with a smooth and highly articulate delivery.

Among Ledford's memorable sayings are:

- "Hello, everybody, this is Cawood Ledford" – His "sign-in" at the beginning of his radio broadcasts is probably his most memorable saying
- "The Wildcats will be moving from left to right (or right to left) on your radio dial." – This now commonplace saying is thought to have originated with Ledford and was mentioned at the outset of basketball games
- "Got it" – In reference to a made basket or free throw
- "A beauty" – A beautifully made basket, especially in reference to an opponent's play
- ”It’s there.” — A made basket, especially a free throw
- ”Kentucky was flat-footed there.” — When an opponent scored off an offensive rebound.
- "Slam" – Exclaimed in a drawn-out style after a dunk shot
- "Stuff shot" - A slam dunk
- "On the dribble" – A very common saying of Ledford's, used when a player elected to dribble the ball rather than pass or shoot in an offensive attack
- "He had a notion" – When a player momentarily deliberated about taking a shot, but thought better of it and passed the ball to a teammate.
- "Bullseye" – A made basket, especially a long-range shot
- "He went to war on that one." – Used to describe a player who demonstrated exceptional or extraordinary effort on a play while encountering significant physical opposition. Said especially of players who drove the lane and shot the ball while drawing a foul, fiercely contested for a rebound, or exerted sustained intense effort over the course of a key play.
- "Puts it up and in" – Said of a close range shot made in heavy traffic
- "Cats are Runnin'" – A beloved saying of Ledford's believed to have originated in the 1950s when the Wildcats played in an almost exclusively up-tempo style. This saying is so associated with Ledford, current play-by-play announcer Tom Leach inserts into his broadcasts on occasion as a tribute to Ledford.
- "Shoot it, Sean" – When Ledford suspected that a player was being too hesitant, he occasionally inserted into his commentary an exhortation to shoot
- "He shot that one from Paducah" – After an especially long shot, Ledford would insert the name of a town in the state of Kentucky at the end of this saying for effect. Variant: When Kentucky played a road game, this changed to a local landmark. For example, after a long 3-point shot made by Rex Chapman in 1986 at Louisville, he changed it to "the Watterson Expressway."
- ”He whipped his man.”/“He whipped him.” - Said of a player who dominated an opponent on either side of the ball.
- "It danced around a bit, but it finally fell"/"It had a lot of iron on it, but it finally fell" – Said of a made basket in which the ball bounced around the rim or backboard excessively before passing through the hoop.
- "Any flags, Ralph?" – During Kentucky football games, if a Wildcat player scored a long touchdown, Ledford would ask long-time broadcast partner and color commentator Ralph Hacker if the referee had thrown a flag. This question was as much about genuine concern that the play would be called back as much as his remembering how many similar plays were negated due to Kentucky penalties in previous games. The humorous question caught on with fans, and is perhaps Ledford's most memorable football saying.

In a football-dominated league known for "homer" radio announcers, Ledford had a clearly established national reputation as a professional first and a fan second. His composure, even during heartbreaking losses, was considered his finest attribute. For example, immediately after Christian Laettner's game winning basket in the 1992 East Regional Final, Ledford said "Gooooooood! And Duke wins it 104 to 103! And that is why they're number one!" More than any sports broadcaster in SEC history, Ledford was asked to work play-by-play for Final Four and National Championship broadcasts.

His first obligation to the listeners was to build their trust and he achieved this by calling plays as they happened, praising hard effort, and meting out criticism when it was warranted. He was not afraid to criticize Kentucky when they played poorly, when they played tentatively, or when they were poorly coached. In turn he regularly held out high praise for game opponents, particularly individual players who turned in extraordinary performances.

Ledford was very fair toward officials, but, consistent with his straight-shooting approach, was not beyond calling out egregious calls. For example, in a hotly contested 1981 home tilt against SEC champion and #2 ranked LSU, Kentucky guard Dirk Minniefield was whistled for a bad charging call in the final moments and Ledford asked facetiously to long time color commentator Ralph Hacker "Did they ride here on the bus together?" Kentucky eventually prevailed 73–71 on a blocked shot by Sam Bowie in the game's final seconds.

Another example of calling out egregious behavior came at the conclusion of the 1975 Regional Final in Dayton, Ohio. Kentucky's core of four freshmen upset undefeated and #1 ranked Indiana 92–90, after Indiana had beaten Kentucky badly earlier in the season. After the game, Indiana coach Bob Knight, who was good friends with Ledford, walked off the floor, refusing to shake hands with Kentucky players and coaches. Ralph Hacker noticed it and Ledford replied "Well, I'm sure Coach Hall couldn't care less; or if you'll pardon the expression, give a damn."

== Fan memories ==
Fans of Ledford frequently share stories about listening to his University of Kentucky broadcasts over the years. Many of these stories revolve around themes of fans going to great lengths to pick up Kentucky radio affiliates from faraway locales, tuning in to hear Ledford's voice over the radio even when the game was televised, and feeling as if Ledford's voice extended a feeling of warmth, familiarity, and comfort on sometimes dreary winter nights.

== Legacy ==
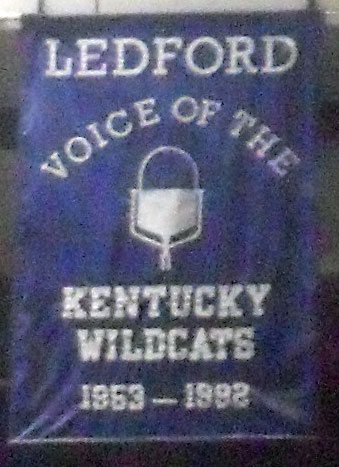
A banner honoring Ledford hangs in Rupp Arena

Perhaps because of the success of the University of Kentucky's men's basketball program, Ledford is generally best remembered as a basketball announcer. In a 2001 dedication, the University of Kentucky named its basketball court at Rupp Arena in Ledford's honor. The words "Cawood's Court" and a radio microphone are painted on the floor in commemoration. The microphone is located at the sideline opposite the scorer's table close to where Ledford broadcast games.

Cawood Ledford was inducted into the Kentucky Athletic Hall of Fame in 1987. He won three Eclipse Awards for outstanding coverage of thoroughbred racing. He was also named Kentucky's Sportscaster of the Year a record 22 times.

Ledford is generally considered among the finest play-by-play commentators in the history of American sports broadcasting and is highly esteemed by his peers. In the 2021 SEC Storied film More Than a Voice, an SEC broadcaster quoted the University of Tennessee's longtime play-by-play announcer John Ward who felt that Ledford was the greatest play-by-play announcer in the history of broadcasting. The broadcaster spoke for his colleagues in saying that if one were forced to choose just one broadcaster to call a game, Ledford was the choice.

Ledford was a well-known figure in Kentucky, in college basketball, in college football, and in horse racing.

Commenting on Ledford's legacy after his death, longtime friend and Lexington-based CEO of Host Communications, Jim Host, said "Cawood was the ultimate in genteel class. He exuded a quiet confidence, but always remembered who he was, where he came from and who he worked for." In 1992, Host Communications published Cawood Ledford's autobiography, Hello Everybody, This is Cawood Ledford, as told to sportswriter and author Billy Reed.

During the Summer of 2014, Kentucky announced that its multi-team event would be called the Cawood Ledford Classic, in tribute to Ledford. Previously, this event was known as the Keightley Classic, in honor of Bill Keightley, Kentucky's longtime equipment manager. The Cawood Ledford Classic had 5 participants for the event, including Kentucky, Grand Canyon, Texas-Arlington, Montana State and Buffalo. Kentucky won each of their four games against these opponents.
