= Mount Pleasant Historic District =

Mount Pleasant Historic District may refer to:

- Mount Pleasant Historic District (Carnesville, Georgia), listed on the NRHP in Georgia
- Mount Pleasant Historic District (Boston, Massachusetts), listed on the NRHP in Massachusetts
- Mount Pleasant Downtown Historic District (Isabella, Michigan), listed on the NRHP in Michigan
- Mount Pleasant Historic District (Mount Pleasant, New Jersey), listed on the NRHP in New Jersey
- Mount Pleasant Historic District (Mount Pleasant, North Carolina), listed on the NRHP in North Carolina
- Mount Pleasant Collegiate Institute Historic District, Mount Pleasant, North Carolina, listed on the NRHP in North Carolina
- Mount Pleasant Historic District (Mt. Pleasant, Ohio), listed on the NRHP in Ohio
- Mount Pleasant Historic District (Harrisburg, Pennsylvania), listed on the NRHP in Pennsylvania
- Mount Pleasant Historic District (Mount Pleasant, Pennsylvania), listed on the NRHP in Pennsylvania
- Mount Pleasant Historic District (Mount Pleasant, South Carolina), listed on the NRHP in South Carolina
- Mount Pleasant Commercial Historic District (Mount Pleasant, Tennessee), listed on the NRHP in Tennessee
- Mount Pleasant Commercial Historic District (Mount Pleasant, Utah), listed on the NRHP in Utah
- Mount Pleasant Historic District (Washington, D.C.), listed on the NRHP in Washington, D.C.

== See also ==
- Mount Pleasant Commercial Historic District (disambiguation)
