= Governor Shirley Square Historic District =

Historic district in Massachusetts, United States

- U.S. National Register of Historic Places
- U.S. Historic district
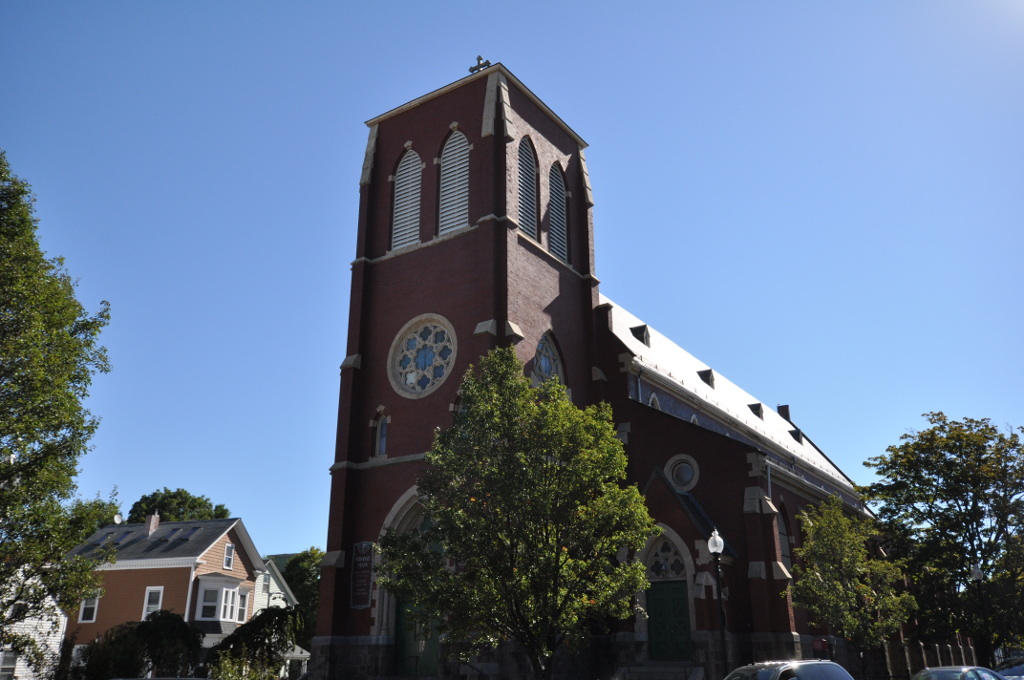
- St. Patrick's Church

- Location within Massachusetts Location within the United States
- Location: Dudley, Hampden, Dunmore & Magazine Sts., Blue Hill & Mt. Pleasant Ave., Roxbury, Boston, Massachusetts
- Coordinates: 42°19′33″N 71°4′31″W
- Area: 1.7 acres (0.69 ha)
- Built: 1872
- NRHP reference No.: 16000454
- Added to NRHP: July 18, 2016

The Governor Shirley Square Historic District encompasses a cluster of civic, residential, and religious buildings at the junction of Dudley, Hampden, and Dunmore Streets in the Roxbury neighborhood of Boston, Massachusetts. Named for colonial governor William Shirley in 1913, the square was developed in the 1870s and 1880s as a major locus of civic development after the city of Roxbury was annexed to Boston in 1868. The district was listed on the National Register of Historic Places in 2016.

== Description and history ==
Governor Shirley Square is an X-shaped intersection located southeast of Nubian Square (formerly Dudley Square), at the junction of Dunmore and Hampden Streets with Dudley Street, an arterial roadway through Boston's Roxbury neighborhood. Facing this intersection, and arrayed along the southward block of Dudley Street, are six buildings that make up the historic district. All are masonry structures, built in the 19th century between 1872 and 1896. The most visually striking is the 1873 St. Patrick's Roman Catholic Church, built of red brick in the Gothic Revival style. Also facing the square are two mixed commercial-residential apartment blocks on the west side of Dudley Street (built in the 1890s), and the c. 1880 McDermott Block, a five-section building that is in mixed residential and commercial use. Further south on Dudley Street stand two municipal buildings: the 1872 Second Empire-styled Roxbury District 9 police station, and an 1874 fire station.

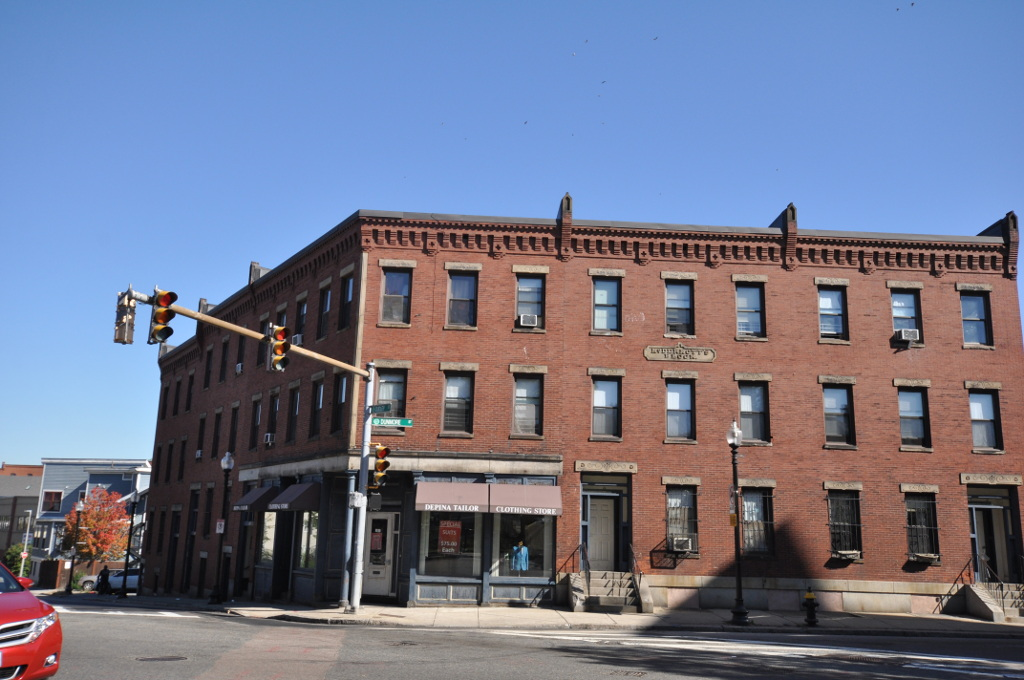
McDermott's Block

Before the 1840s, the area that is now Governor Shirley Square was largely undeveloped farmland. Development nearby began to its west, where Mount Pleasant area was developed between then and the 1860s. In 1860, a horse-drawn streetcar line was extended down what is now Dudley Street from the then-Dudley Square area, and development expanded into this area. In 1868 the city of Boston annexed Roxbury, and proceeded to make municipal improvements near the square, building the police and fire stations. The growing Catholic population of the area also prompted the construction of St. Patrick's. The intersection was formally dedicated in honor of colonial governor William Shirley in 1913. (Shirley's mansion, a National Historic Landmark, is located several blocks south of this intersection.)

== See also ==
- National Register of Historic Places listings in southern Boston, Massachusetts
