= Mount Pleasant station =

Mount Pleasant station may refer to:

== Canada ==
- Mount Pleasant station (SkyTrain), a future rapid transit station in Vancouver, British Columbia
- Mount Pleasant GO Station, Brampton, Ontario
- Mount Pleasant station (Brant County, Ontario), a former railway station
- Mount Pleasant station (Toronto), Ontario, a light rail station

== United States ==
- Mount Pleasant station (Iowa), Mount Pleasant, Iowa, an Amtrak intercity train station
- Mount Pleasant station (Metro-North), Mount Pleasant, Westchester County, New York
- Mount Pleasant station (Ulster and Delaware Railroad), in Mount Pleasant, New York
- Mount Pleasant station (Michigan)

== Elsewhere ==
- Mount Pleasant MRT station, a station in Singapore
- Mountpleasant railway station, a former station in County Louth, Ireland

== Other uses ==
- Mount Pleasant (disambiguation)
