= Mount Pleasant Township =

Mount Pleasant Township may refer to:

== Arkansas ==
- Mount Pleasant Township, Scott County, Arkansas, in Scott County, Arkansas
- Mount Pleasant Township, Searcy County, Arkansas

== Illinois ==
- Mount Pleasant Township, Whiteside County, Illinois

== Indiana ==
- Mount Pleasant Township, Delaware County, Indiana

== Kansas ==
- Mount Pleasant Township, Atchison County, Kansas
- Mount Pleasant Township, Labette County, Kansas

== Minnesota ==
- Mount Pleasant Township, Wabasha County, Minnesota

== Missouri ==
- Mount Pleasant Township, Bates County, Missouri
- Mount Pleasant Township, Cass County, Missouri
- Mount Pleasant Township, Lawrence County, Missouri
- Mount Pleasant Township, Scotland County, Missouri

== Ohio ==
- Mount Pleasant Township, Jefferson County, Ohio

== Pennsylvania ==
- Mount Pleasant Township, Adams County, Pennsylvania
- Mount Pleasant Township, Columbia County, Pennsylvania
- Mount Pleasant Township, Washington County, Pennsylvania
- Mount Pleasant Township, Wayne County, Pennsylvania
- Mount Pleasant Township, Westmoreland County, Pennsylvania

== South Dakota ==
- Mount Pleasant Township, Clark County, South Dakota, in Clark County, South Dakota
