= Harlan, Kentucky =

- City
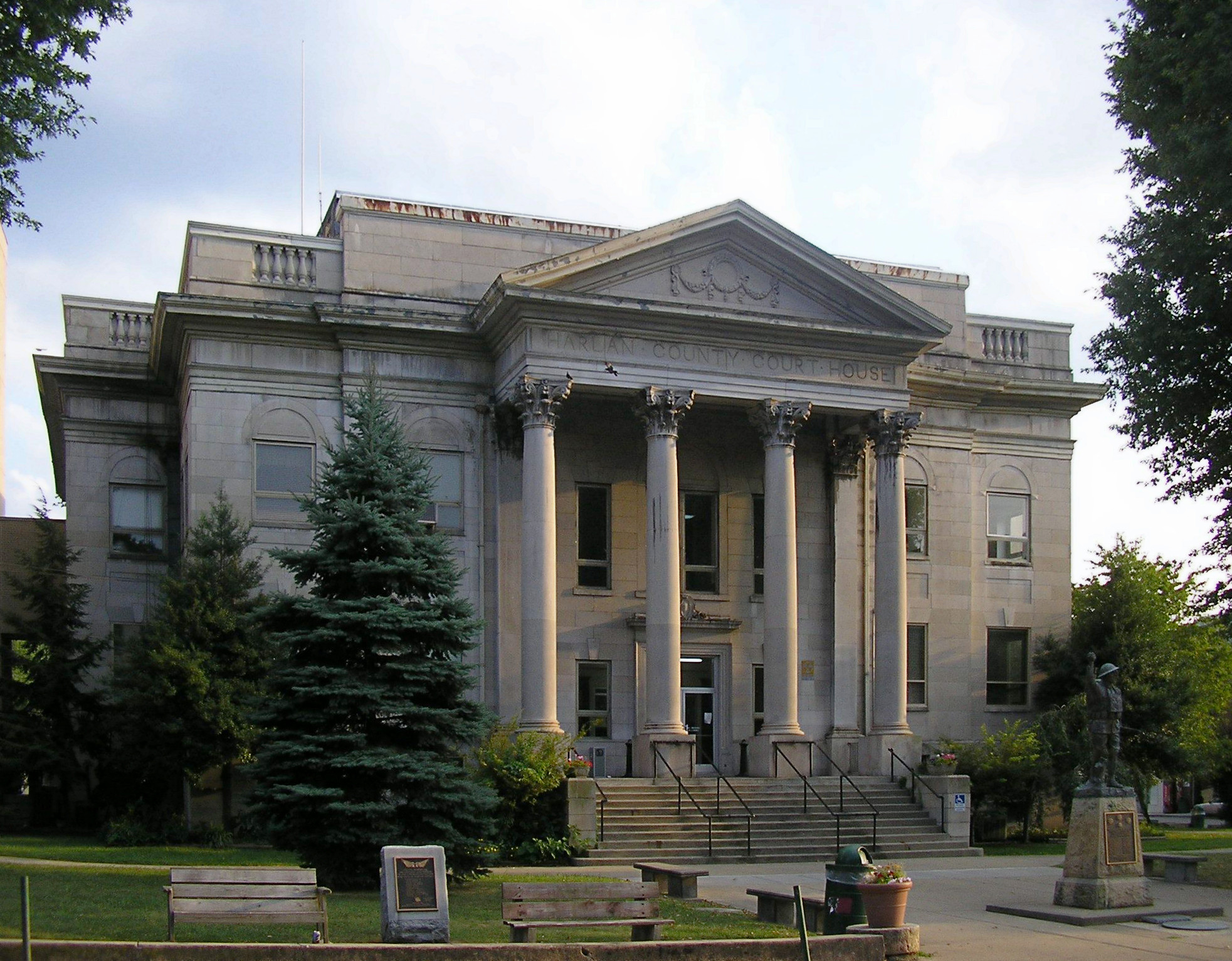
- Harlan County Kentucky Courthouse

- Location of Harlan in Harlan County, Kentucky.
- Coordinates: 36°50′29″N 83°19′12″W
- Country: United States
- State: Kentucky
- County: Harlan
- Named for: Its county

Area
  - Total: 1.34 sq mi (3.46 km^{2})
  - Land: 1.30 sq mi (3.37 km^{2})
  - Water: 0.031 sq mi (0.08 km^{2})
- Elevation: 1,191 ft (363 m)

Population (2020)
  - Total: 1,776
  - Estimate (2022): 1,885
  - Density: 1,364.1/sq mi (526.68/km^{2})
- Time zone: UTC-5 (Eastern (EST))
  - Summer (DST): UTC-4 (EDT)
- ZIP code: 40831
- Area code: 606
- FIPS code: 21-34732
- GNIS feature ID: 0493746

Harlan is a home rule-class city in and the county seat of Harlan County, Kentucky, United States. As of the 2020 census, Harlan had a population of 1,776.

Harlan is one of three Kentucky county seats to share its name with its county, the others being Greenup and Henderson.

== History ==
Harlan was first settled by Samuel and Chloe Howard in 1796. Upon the founding of Harlan County (named for Kentucky pioneer Silas Harlan) in 1819, the Howards donated 12 acres (49,000 m^{2}) of land to serve as the county seat. The community there was already known as "Mount Pleasant", apparently owing to a nearby Indian mound. A post office was established on September 19, 1828, but called "Harlan Court House" due to another Mt. Pleasant preempting that name. During the Civil War, Confederate raiders under General Humphrey Marshall occupied the town; the local postmaster renamed the community "Spurlock" after himself; in October 1863, the courthouse was burnt down in reprisal for the Union destruction of the courthouse in Lee County, Virginia. In 1865, the post office was renamed "Harlan", and although the community was formally incorporated by the state assembly as "Mount Pleasant" on April 15, 1884, the town was already usually called "Harlan Court House" or "Harlan Town" by its inhabitants. The city's terms of incorporation were amended to change the name to "Harlan" on March 13, 1912. One year before, the Louisville and Nashville Railroad had arrived in Harlan and prompted massive growth. The city had initially expanded east along the Clover Fork; after World War II, it also expanded south along Martin's Fork.

Harlan is the site of a criminal case in which a man, Condy Dabney, was convicted in 1924 of murdering a person who was later found alive.

A flood in 1977 prompted federal aid that diverted the Clover Fork into man-made tunnels under Ivy Hill in 1989. In the 1990s, a flood wall was completed on the city's west side along the four-lane bypass U.S. Route 421.

== Geography ==
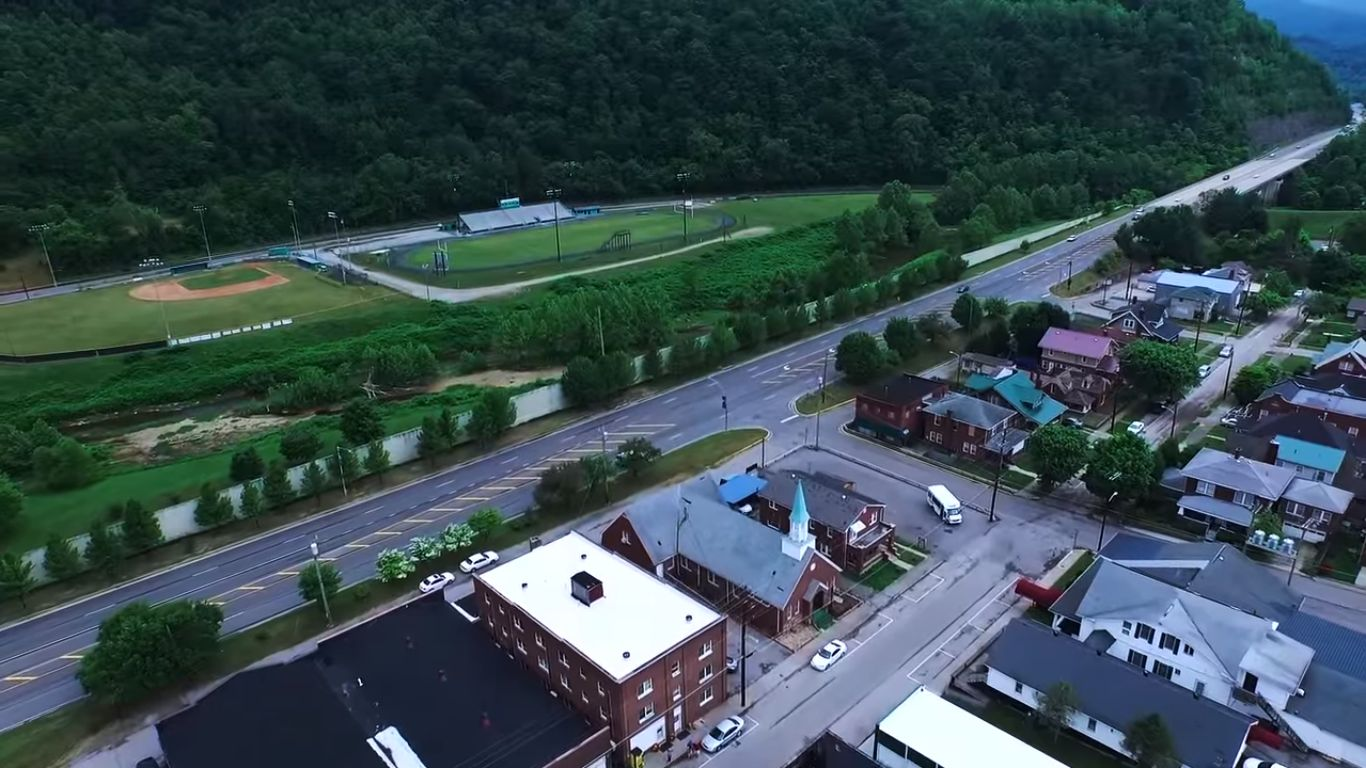
A view of U.S. Route 421 from downtown; the flood wall and Harlan Independent Schools' athletic fields are also visible.

Harlan is located in west-central Harlan County at the junction of the Clover Fork and Martin's Fork Rivers. The Clover Fork continues north 1.5 miles (2.4 km) to join the Poor Fork, forming the Cumberland River, a major tributary of the Ohio River. Harlan is in a narrow mountain valley, constrained to the north by the western end of Black Mountain, to the south by Little Black Mountain, and to the west by Ewing Spur. The elevation at the Harlan Courthouse is 1,197 feet (365 m) above sea level, while the surrounding ridges rise outside the city limiting to 2,100 feet (640 m) (Black Mountain), 3,000 feet (910 m) (Little Black Mountain), and 2,300 feet (700 m) (Ewing Spur).

U.S. Route 421 passes through the city as four-lane highway; it leads north 34 miles (55 km) to Hyden and southeast 23 miles (37 km) to Pennington Gap, Virginia. The closest city with a population greater than 10,000 is Middlesboro, Kentucky, 42 miles (68 km) to the southeast via U.S. Routes 119 and 25E.

According to the United States Census Bureau, the city of Harlan has a total area of 1.4 square miles (3.5 km^{2}), of which 0.03 sq mi (0.08 km^{2}), or 2.45%, is covered by water.

=== Climate ===
The climate in this area is characterized by hot, humid summers and generally mild to cool winters. According to the Köppen climate classification, Harlan has a humid subtropical climate, Cfa on climate maps.

== Demographics ==
Historical population
Census	Pop.	Note	%±
1890	361		—
1900	557		54.3%
1910	657		18.0%
1920	2,647		302.9%
1930	4,327		63.5%
1940	5,122		18.4%
1950	4,786		−6.6%
1960	4,177		−12.7%
1970	3,318		−20.6%
1980	3,024		−8.9%
1990	2,686		−11.2%
2000	2,081		−22.5%
2010	1,745		−16.1%
2020	1,776		1.8%
2022 (est.)	1,885		6.1%
U.S. Decennial Census

=== 2020 census ===
As of the 2020 census, Harlan had a population of 1,776. The median age was 39.7 years; 23.9% of the residents were under 18 and 18.0% were 65 or older. For every 100 females, there were 89.5 males, and for every 100 females 18 and over, there were 86.3 males 18 and over.

About 91.6% of residents lived in urban areas, while 8.4% lived in rural areas.

Of the 803 households in Harlan, 28.0% had children under 18 living in them, 34.4% were married-couple households, 21.4% were households with a male householder and no spouse or partner present, and 39.2% were households with a female householder and no spouse or partner present. About 39.5% of all households were made up of individuals, and 16.8% had someone living alone who was 65 or older.

The city had 896 housing units, of which 10.4% were vacant. The homeowner vacancy rate was 2.3% and the rental vacancy rate was 8.9%.

Racial composition as of the 2020 census
Race	Number	Percentage
White	1,561	87.9%
Black or African American	80	4.5%
American Indian and Alaska Native	6	0.3%
Asian	24	1.4%
Native Hawaiian and other Pacific Islander	0	0.0%
Some other race	18	1.0%
Two or more races	87	4.9%
Hispanic or Latino (of any race)	27	1.5%

=== 2000 census ===
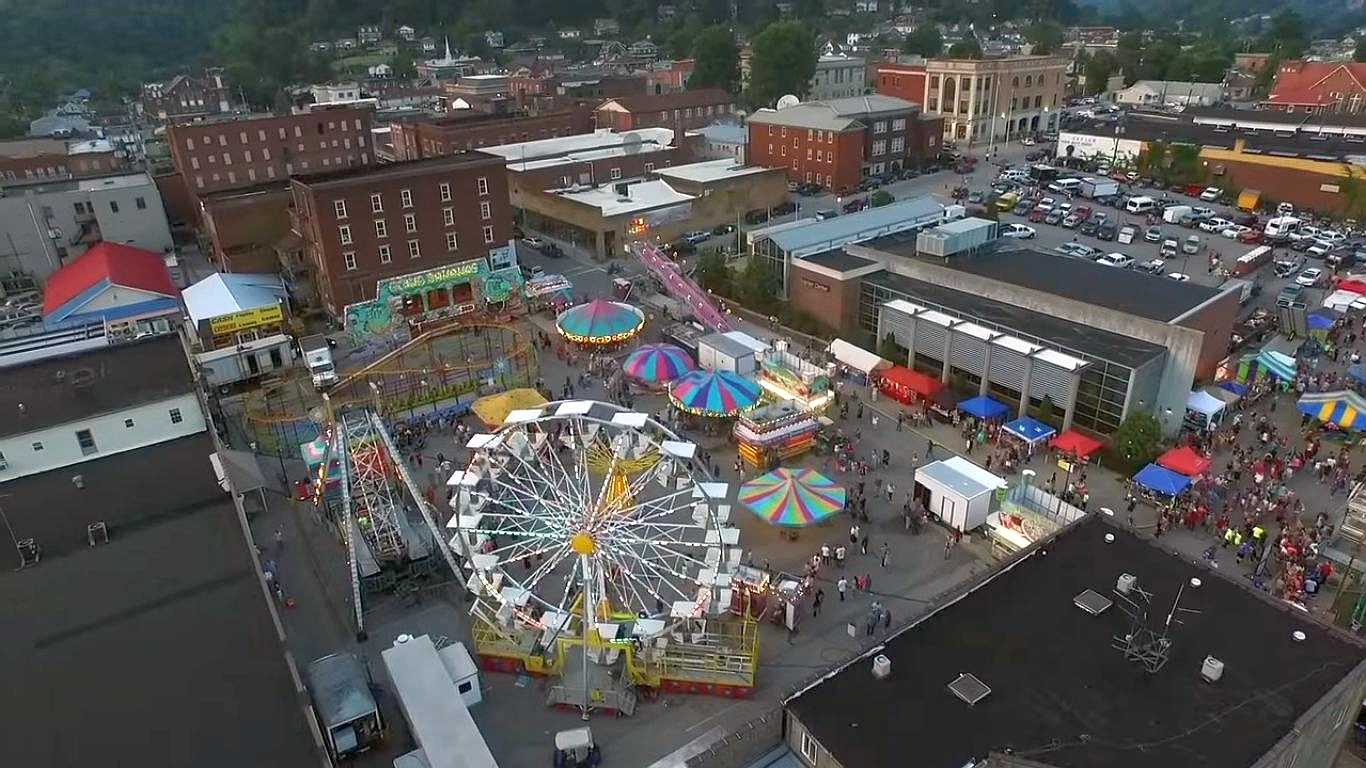
Downtown Harlan during the annual Poke Sallet Festival

As of the 2000 census, 2,081 people, 926 households, and 550 families resided in the city. The population density was 1,187.4 inhabitants per square mile (458.5/km^{2}). The 1,060 housing units had an average density of 604.8 per square mile (2.339/km^{2}). The racial makeup of the city was 91.01% White, 7.02% Black or African American, 0.29% Native American, 0.86% Asian, and 0.82% from two or more races. Hispanics or Latinos of any race were 0.62% of the population.

Of the 926 households, 24.0% had children under 18 living with them, 41.3% were married couples living together, 14.4% had a female householder with no husband present, and 40.6% were not families. About 39.0% of all households were made up of individuals, and 19.4% had someone living alone who was 65 or older. The average household size was 2.17, and the average family size was 2.91.

In the city, the age distribution was 21.3% under 18, 8.1% from 18 to 24, 25.8% from 25 to 44, 25.1% from 45 to 64, and 19.7% who were 65 age or older. The median age was 42 years. For every 100 females, there were 89.4 males. For every 100 females 18 and over, there were 81.8 males.

The median income in the city for a household was $17,270 and for a family was $29,135. Males had a median income of $37,500 versus $20,852 for females. The per capita income for the city was $15,572. About 23.8% of families and 32.4% of the population were below the poverty line, including 40.0% of those under 18 and 20.6% of those 65 or over.

== Education ==
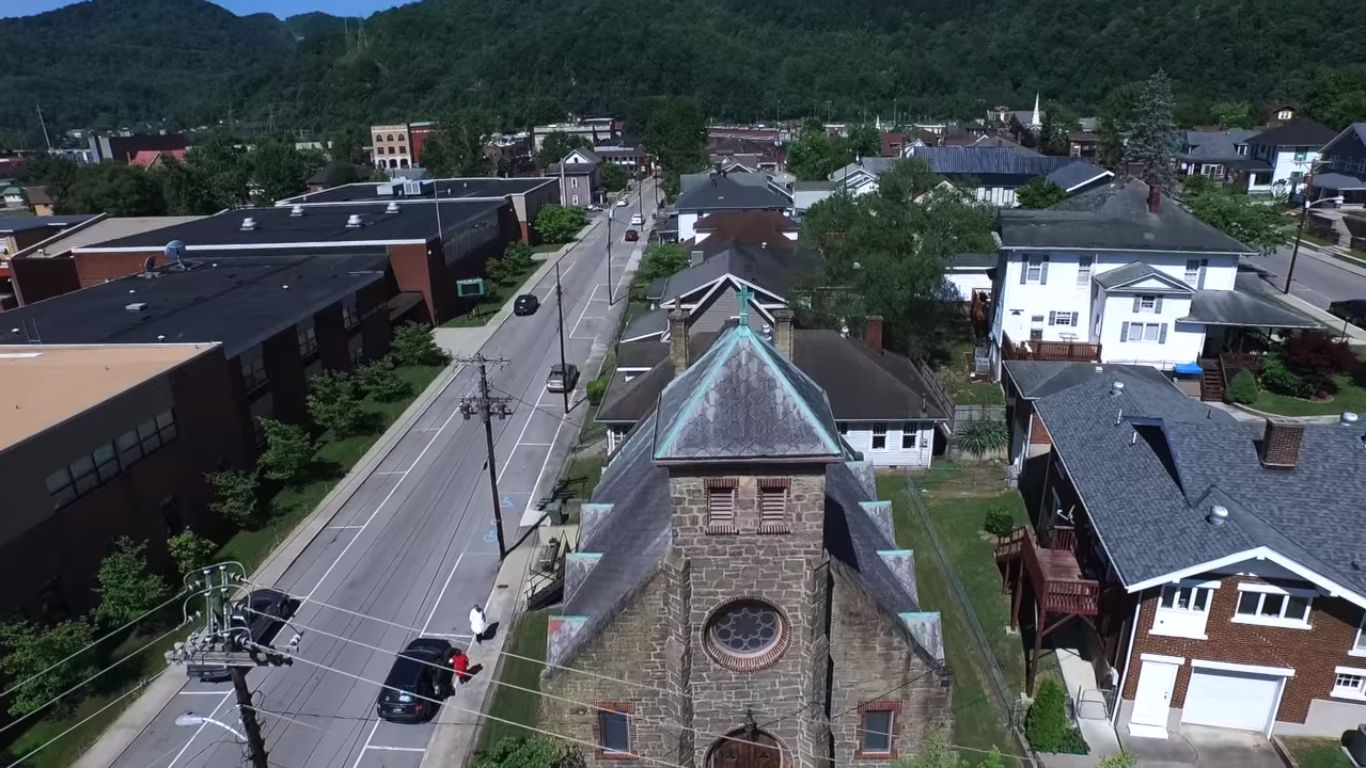
Overlooking East Central Street. Harlan High School and Middle School are visible on the left.

Two school districts, the Harlan County Public Schools and the Harlan Independent Schools, are based in the city. The independent schools, whose district roughly coincides with the city limits of Harlan, feature Harlan Elementary, Harlan Middle, and Harlan High Schools.

Harlan County High School, which opened in 2008 as the consolidation of the county district's three previous high schools (James A. Cawood, Evarts, and Cumberland), serves all other public high school students in the county. Harlan also features a campus of Southeast Kentucky Community and Technical College.

Harlan has a lending library, a branch of the Harlan County Public Library.

== Media ==
The Harlan Daily Enterprise is published Monday through Saturday. Radio stations serving Harlan are WHLN (adult contemporary, 1410 AM), WFSR (gospel, 970 AM), and WTUK (country, 105.1 FM).

Some storylines of the FX Networks drama Justified take place in Harlan, although no scenes have been filmed there. The 2012–13 National Geographic series Kentucky Justice which followed the Harlan County Sheriff's Office in their daily duties was filmed in Harlan and Harlan County. Parts of the OxyContin scandal series “Dopesick” also take part in Harlan County.

Harlan serves as the starting point for the Mountain Boy's fatal moonshine run in Robert Mitchum's The Ballad of Thunder Road (1958). The song serves as the theme for the 1958 film of the same title with Mitchum starring as the mountain boy protagonist, Lucas Doolin.

Harlan was also featured in the Darrell Scott song "You'll Never Leave Harlan Alive" (later performed by Brad Paisley, Patty Loveless, and in 2019 by Montgomery Gentry on the CD Outskirts), the Steve Earle song "Harlan Man", the Anna McGarrigle song "Goin' Back to Harlan" (notably covered by Emmylou Harris), the song "Harlan County Line" from Dave Alvin, and the Tyler Childers song "Harlan Road".

Harlan County, USA is a documentary about the coalminers' strike against the Brookside Mine of the Eastover Mining Company in Harlan County in June 1973. Eastover's refusal to sign a contract (when the miners joined with the United Mine Workers of America - UMWA) led to the strike, which lasted more than a year and included violent battles between company personnel and the picketing miners and their supportive women. Director Barbara Kopple puts the strike into perspective by giving some background on the historical plight of the miners and some history of the UMWA. It won an Oscar for Best Documentary in 1977.

== Notable people ==
- Maxine Cheshire, journalist
- Karl Spillman Forester, federal judge for the United States District Court for the Eastern District of Kentucky
- Edwin B. Howard, chief of intelligence of the Allied Land Forces in Central Europe
- Wallace Jones, NBA player
- James E. Keller, former justice of the Kentucky Supreme Court
- Nick Lachey, singer
- Cawood Ledford, University of Kentucky basketball and football announcer
- George Ella Lyon, author
- Jordan Smith, musician and winner of season 9 of The Voice
- Green Wix Unthank, United States District Court judge
- Don Whitehead, two-time Pulitzer Prize-winning reporter and author

== See also ==
- Harlan Commercial District
- Harlan Smokies, a minor league baseball team that operated here during 1948–1965
