= Harlan Commercial District =

- U.S. National Register of Historic Places
- U.S. Historic district
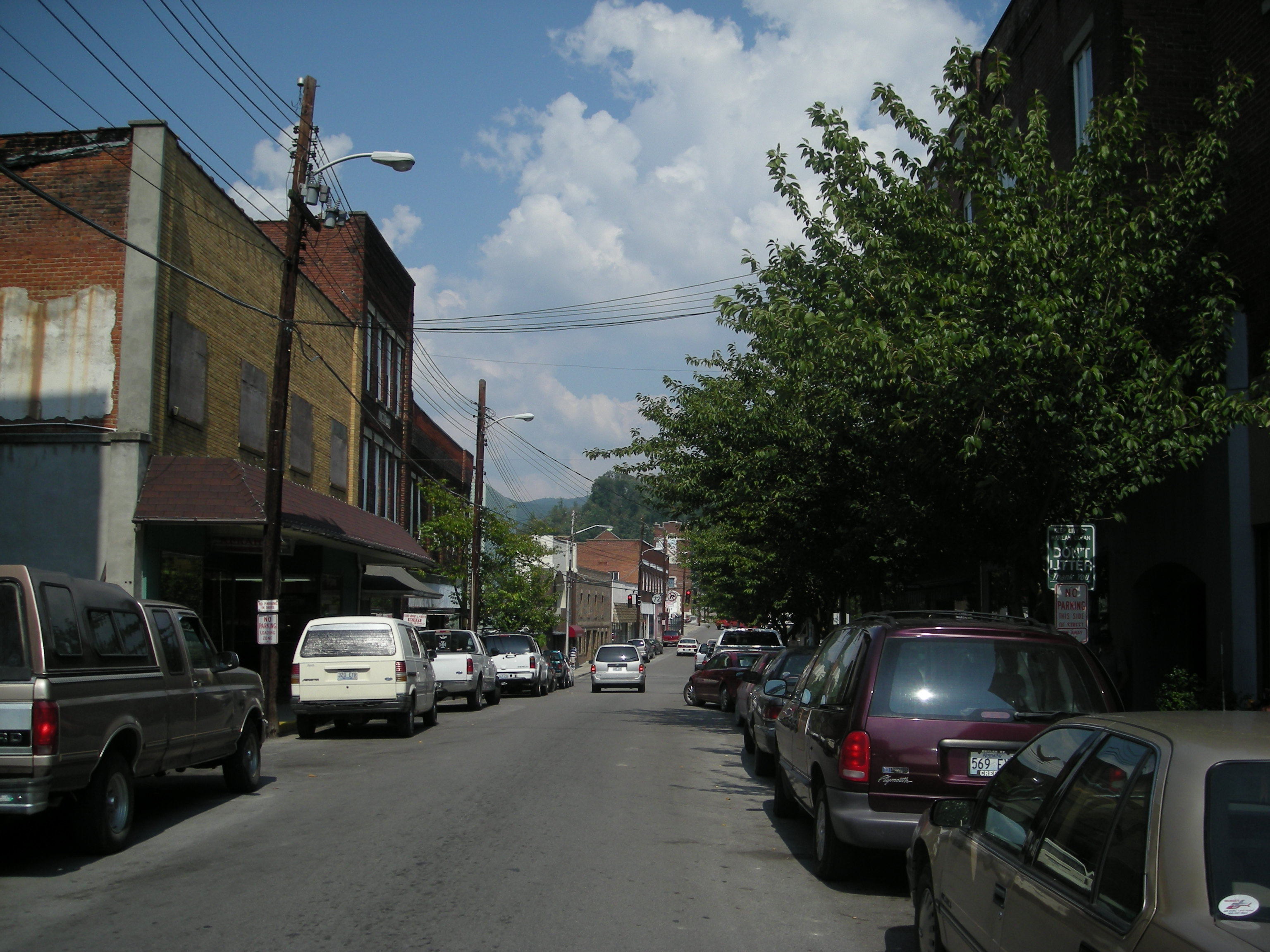
- Main Street in Harlan

- Location within Kentucky Location within the United States
- Location: Roughly bounded by Mound, Second, Clover, and Main Sts., Harlan, Kentucky
- Coordinates: 36°50′49″N 83°19′20″W
- Area: 8.5 acres (3.4 ha)
- NRHP reference No.: 86000461
- Added to NRHP: March 20, 1986

The Harlan Commercial District is a primarily commercial historic district in downtown Harlan, Kentucky, in the United States. The district is centered on the Harlan County Courthouse and includes 41 buildings which contribute to its historic character. While Harlan was founded much earlier as a rural town, it grew considerably when the Louisville & Nashville Railroad built a line through the city in 1911; all of the contributing buildings within the district were built between 1910 and 1936. Nearly all of the buildings feature commercial-style architecture; the exceptions are the Classical Revival courthouse and post office and one Moderne commercial building. Downtown Harlan served as the social, civic, and economic center of the Harlan County mining community, particularly during the mining boom of the 1920s, and the courthouse became the site of several murder trials and legal battles during the Harlan County War.

The district was added to the National Register of Historic Places on March 20, 1986.
