= Lake City and Rochester Stage Road =

Road in Minnesota, United States

Route information
- Length: 32 mi (51 km)
- Existed: 1858–circa-1880

Major junctions
- North end: Lake City, Minnesota
- South end: Rochester, Minnesota

Location
- Country: United States
- State: Minnesota

Highway system
- Minnesota Trunk Highway System; Interstate; US; State; Legislative; Scenic
- Lake City and Rochester Stage Road-Mount Pleasant Section
- U.S. National Register of Historic Places
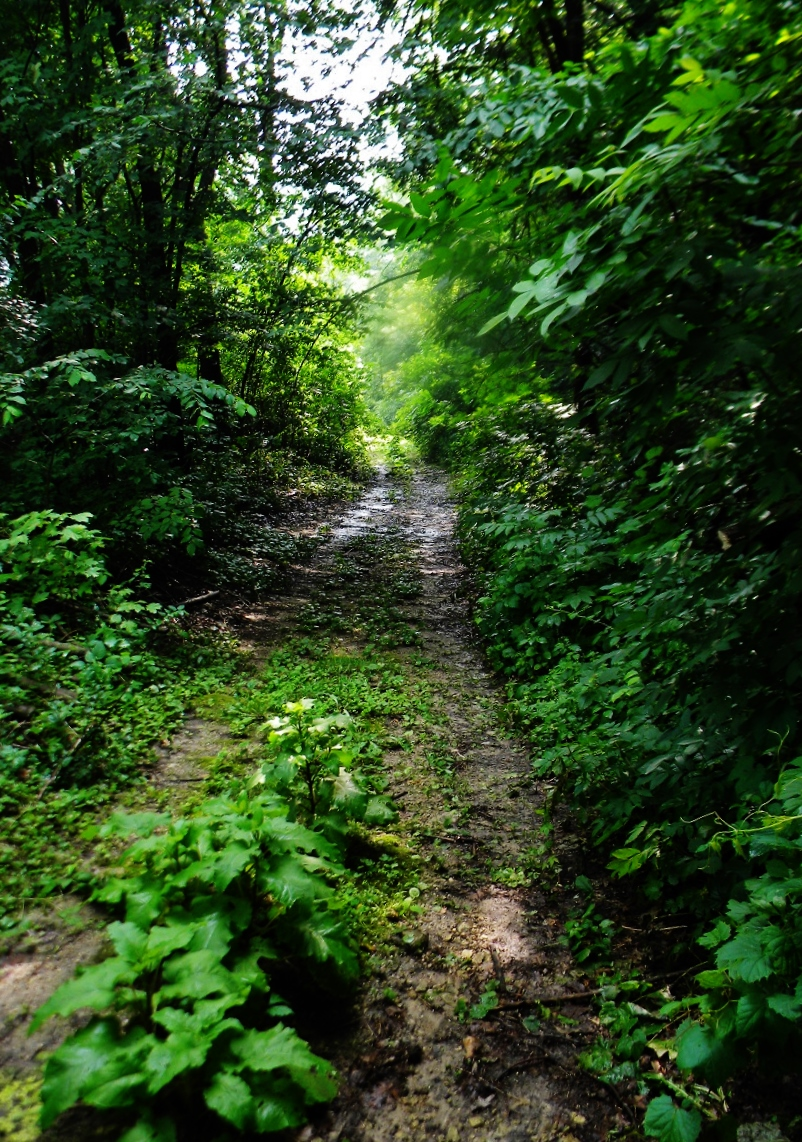
- The Mount Pleasant Section

- Location within Minnesota Location within the United States
- Location: Along U.S. Route 63, Mount Pleasant Township, Minnesota
- Nearest city: Lake City, Minnesota
- Coordinates: 44°24′7″N 92°20′23″W
- Area: Less than one acre
- Built: 1858
- MPS: Overland Staging Industry in Minnesota MPS
- NRHP reference No.: 91001063
- Designated: August 30, 1991

The Lake City and Rochester Stage Road was an early road between Lake City and Rochester, Minnesota, United States. It was blazed in 1858 to carry stagecoach traffic between the Mississippi River port and a major inland town in southeast Minnesota.

== History ==
Construction of the Lake City and Rochester Stage Road was funded by a group of property owners in Lake City, Minnesota, who hoped to funnel trade from the interior through their river port community. They also subsidized a stagecoach line operated by the Northwestern Express Company, which became the Minnesota Stage Company the following year. Work on the 32-mile (51 km) route began in spring 1858 and the stagecoach company was completing daily runs by mid-May. The route was advertised as the shortest between Rochester and the Mississippi River, and superior in condition to all alternatives. In 1859 the U.S. government requested bids from private contractors to deliver mail along the route and received 22, making it one of the most sought-after mail routes in the state.

The Lake City and Rochester Stage Road was blazed near the end of a six-year frenzy of road building in southeast Minnesota. These new transportation connections spurred the region's development. The stage road to Lake City was effective in helping the river port flourish.

Southeast Minnesota's stage roads diminished in importance in 1867 when a railroad line opened between Waseca and Winona, becoming the preferred route to the Mississippi. The route of the Lake City and Rochester Stage Road was eventually straightened and became a leg of U.S. Route 63.

== Mount Pleasant Section ==
When the Lake City and Rochester Stage Road was straightened and incorporated into the modern highway system, a curving 600-foot (180 m) section was abandoned and remains much as it appeared in the mid-19th century. Known as the Mount Pleasant Section for its location within Mount Pleasant Township, it stands on the northwest side of Route 63 about three miles (4.8 km) southwest of Lake City. It comprises a six-foot-wide (1.8 m) dirt path curving through undeveloped woods. It was listed on the National Register of Historic Places in 1991 as the Lake City and Rochester Stage Road-Mount Pleasant Section for its state-level significance in the theme of transportation.
