= Maxine Cheshire =

American newspaper reporter (1930–2020)

- Born: Maxine Hall; April 5, 1930; Harlan, Kentucky, U.S.
- Died: December 31, 2020 (aged 90); McAllen, Texas, U.S.
- Occupation: Reporter

Maxine Cheshire (née Hall; April 5, 1930 – December 31, 2020) was an American newspaper reporter. She worked at The Washington Post between 1965 and 1981.

== Early life ==
Cheshire was born in Harlan, Kentucky, on April 5, 1930. Her father worked as a lawyer who represented the miners' union; her mother worked as his legal assistant. He wore a bulletproof vest to work due to recurring assassination attempts, while her mother had to use the gun she kept in the family home on several occasions.

Cheshire studied at the University of Kentucky between 1949 and 1950, and for a further two years at Union College. Although she initially wanted to follow in her father's footsteps and become a lawyer, his death in 1951 led to her dropping out of college. She subsequently joined The Harlan Daily Enterprise at the age of 21.

== Reporting career ==
Cheshire first worked as a reporter for two local papers, the Barbourville Mountain Advocate and The Harlan Daily Enterprise. From 1951, she worked for three years for the Knoxville News Sentinel as a police reporter. She subsequently joined The Washington Post in 1954. She first worked as a society reporter until 1965, when she began to write her own column, entitled "VIP", until 1981. In that guise she did not simply stick to the contents of a typical gossip columnist, but spoke of other, more serious matters such as bribes to government officials. Because of this, she was known and feared by the establishment, having worked on a variety of scandal-type stories concerning various political leaders, such as Koreagate, the lechery of John F. Kennedy, and Richard Nixon's habit of keeping, illegally, gifts given to him by foreign dignitaries. This line of work earned her the nickname "The Last of the Fast-Draw Gunslingers" at the Post.

Cheshire wrote an eight-part series in the early 1960s on the restoration of the White House undertaken by Jacqueline Kennedy. She reported that several pieces that were supposedly antiques were actually fakes, and that the true cost of the decorations exceeded the official stated figure. President Kennedy phoned Phil Graham, the publisher of the Post, to gripe about the report. He said, "Maxine Cheshire has reduced my wife to tears. Listen to her", as his wife cried in the background.

Cheshire was the subject of one of Frank Sinatra's most widely known slurs in 1973 when, at a pre-inaugural party, he told her, "Get away from me, you scum. Go home and take a bath ... You're nothing but a two-dollar cunt. You know what that means, don't you? You've been laying down for two dollars all your life". With that, he thrust two one-dollar bills into her wine glass in front of a variety of witnesses and added, "Here's two dollars, baby, that's what you're used to".

Ben Bradlee, one of the editors of the Post during Cheshire's time there, wrote in his autobiography A Good Life that he "probably spent more time dousing fires ignited by Maxine than any other journalist except those that Woodward and Bernstein would ignite in 1972". However, he added that "she was fun to work with and awesome to watch once she sank her teeth in someone’s flank".

== Personal life ==
Cheshire's first marriage was to Herbert Cheshire, a fellow journalist. Together, they had four children: Marc, Hall, Gideon, and Leigh. They later divorced. She subsequently married Jasper "Jack" Warren – who owned an oil-drilling company in Texas – in 1982. They moved to Houston, and remained married until his death in 2013.

Cheshire died on December 31, 2020, at her home in McAllen, Texas. She was 90, and suffered from cardiovascular disease in the time leading up to her death.
