= Mount Pleasant Commercial Historic District =

Mount Pleasant Commercial Historic District may refer to:

- Mount Pleasant Commercial Historic District (Mount Pleasant, Tennessee), listed on the NRHP in Tennessee
- Mount Pleasant Commercial Historic District (Mount Pleasant, Utah), listed on the NRHP in Utah

== See also ==
- Mount Pleasant Historic District (disambiguation)
