= Mount Pleasant School =

Mount Pleasant School or Mt. Pleasant School may refer to:

in Canada

- Mount Pleasant School (Ontario, Canada)

in New Zealand

- Mount Pleasant School (Christchurch)

in the United States

(by state)

- Mt. Pleasant School (Alamosa, Colorado), listed on the NRHP in Colorado
- Mount Pleasant School (St. Louis, Missouri), listed on the NRHP in Missouri
- Mount Pleasant School (Harrison Township, New Jersey), listed on the NRHP in New Jersey
- Mount Pleasant High School Mechanical Arts Building, Mount Pleasant, UT, listed on the NRHP in Utah
- Mt. Pleasant School (Gerrardstown, West Virginia), listed on the NRHP in West Virginia

in Zimbabwe

- Mount Pleasant School (Joshua Nkomo High School)(Harare, Zimbabwe)

== See also ==
- Mount Pleasant Area School District, in Pennsylvania
- Mount Pleasant High School (disambiguation)
- Mount Pleasant (disambiguation)
