= Mount Pleasant (Staunton, Virginia) =

Historic district in Virginia, United States

- U.S. National Register of Historic Places
- U.S. Historic district
- Virginia Landmarks Register
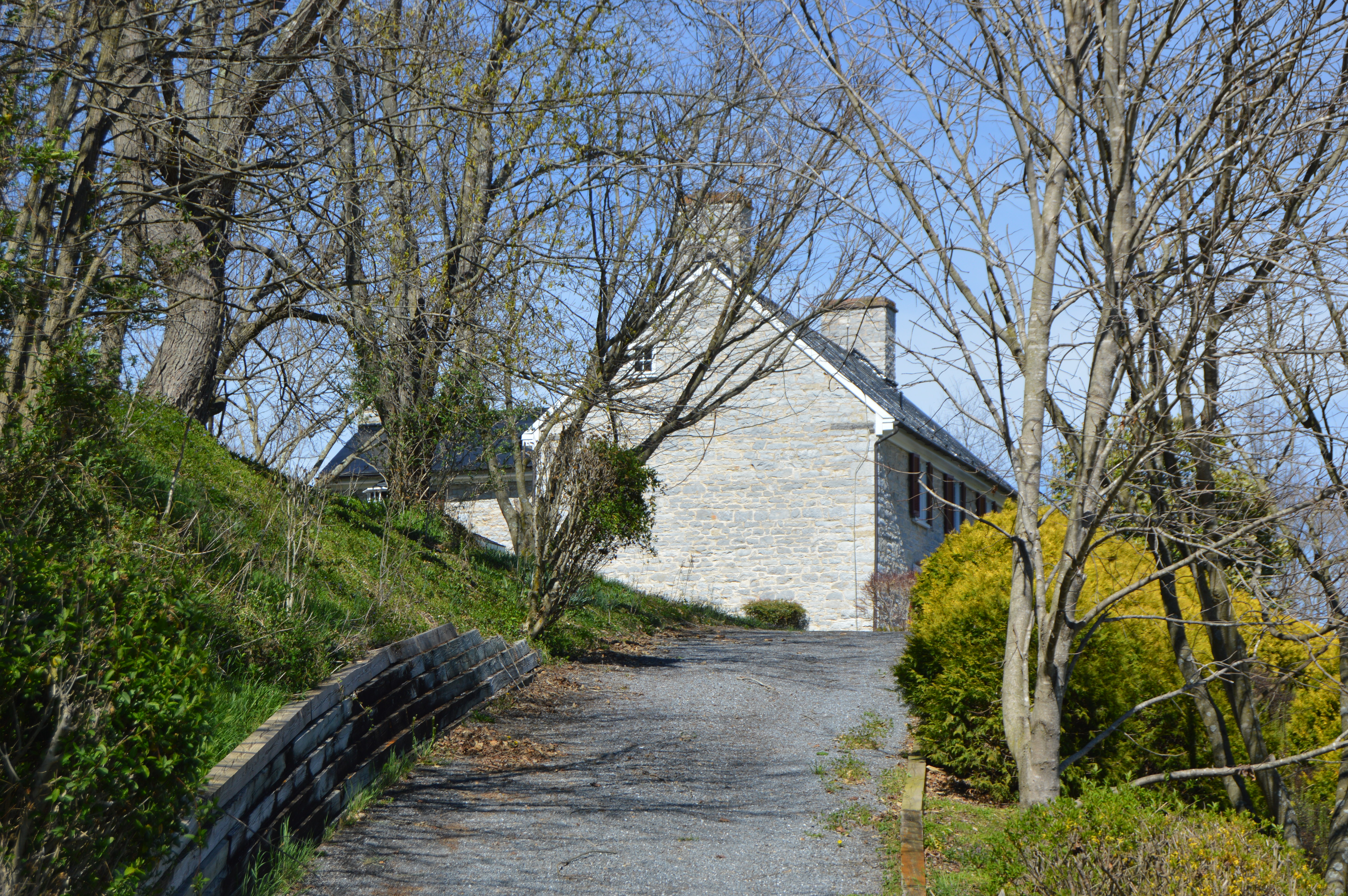
- Northern side

- Location within Virginia Location within the United States
- Location: 879 Middle River Rd., north of Staunton, Virginia
- Coordinates: 38°14′36″N 79°05′10″W
- Area: 316.2 acres (128.0 ha)
- Built: c. 1780-1810
- Architectural style: Federal
- NRHP reference No.: 89001792
- VLR No.: 007-0024

Significant dates
- Added to NRHP: October 30, 1989
- Designated VLR: April 18, 1989, October 10, 2007

Mount Pleasant is a historic home and farm and national historic district located near Staunton, Augusta County, Virginia. The house was built about 1780–1810, and is a two-story, hall-parlor plan limestone structure with a rear ell dating to the mid-19th century. It is reflective of architecture of the Federal era. It has an original one-story brick ell. Also on the property are a contributing barn, corncrib, garage, storage shed, chicken house, the spring house, and an equipment shed. The property also include the ruins of a mill.

It was listed on the National Register of Historic Places in 1989.
