= Mount Pleasant High School =

Mount Pleasant High School may refer to one of the following secondary schools:

- Mount Pleasant High School (Arkansas), Mount Pleasant, Arkansas
- Mt. Pleasant High School (San Jose, California), San Jose, California
- Mount Pleasant High School (Delaware), New Castle County, Delaware
- Mount Pleasant High School (Iowa), Mount Pleasant, Iowa
- Mount Pleasant High School (Michigan), Mount Pleasant, Michigan
- Mount Pleasant High School (North Carolina), Mount Pleasant, North Carolina
- Mount Pleasant High School (North Dakota), Rolla, North Dakota
- Mount Pleasant High School (Pennsylvania), Mount Pleasant, Pennsylvania
- Mount Pleasant High School (Rhode Island), Providence, Rhode Island
- Mount Pleasant High School (South Carolina), Mount Pleasant, South Carolina
- Mount Pleasant High School (Tennessee), Mount Pleasant, Tennessee
- Mount Pleasant High School (Texas), Mount Pleasant, Texas
- Mount Pleasant High School (Harare, Zimbabwe), Harare, Zimbabwe

== See also ==
- Mount Pleasant School (disambiguation)
