= Mount Pleasant, Kentucky (disambiguation) =

Mount Pleasant, Kentucky is in Trimble County, whose post office operated from 1892–1907.

Mount Pleasant has also referred to several communities in the Commonwealth of Kentucky:

- Harlan, Kentucky in Harlan County, also known as Mount Pleasant from 1819–1912
- Boone Furnace in Carter County, known as Mount Pleasant from 1857–1860
