= Mount Pleasant, Evans County, Georgia =

Unincorporated community

Coordinates: 32°11′03″N 81°51′26″W

Mount Pleasant is an unincorporated community in Evans County, in the U.S. state of Georgia.

== History ==
Mount Pleasant took its name from an old church at the town site.
