= WHLN =

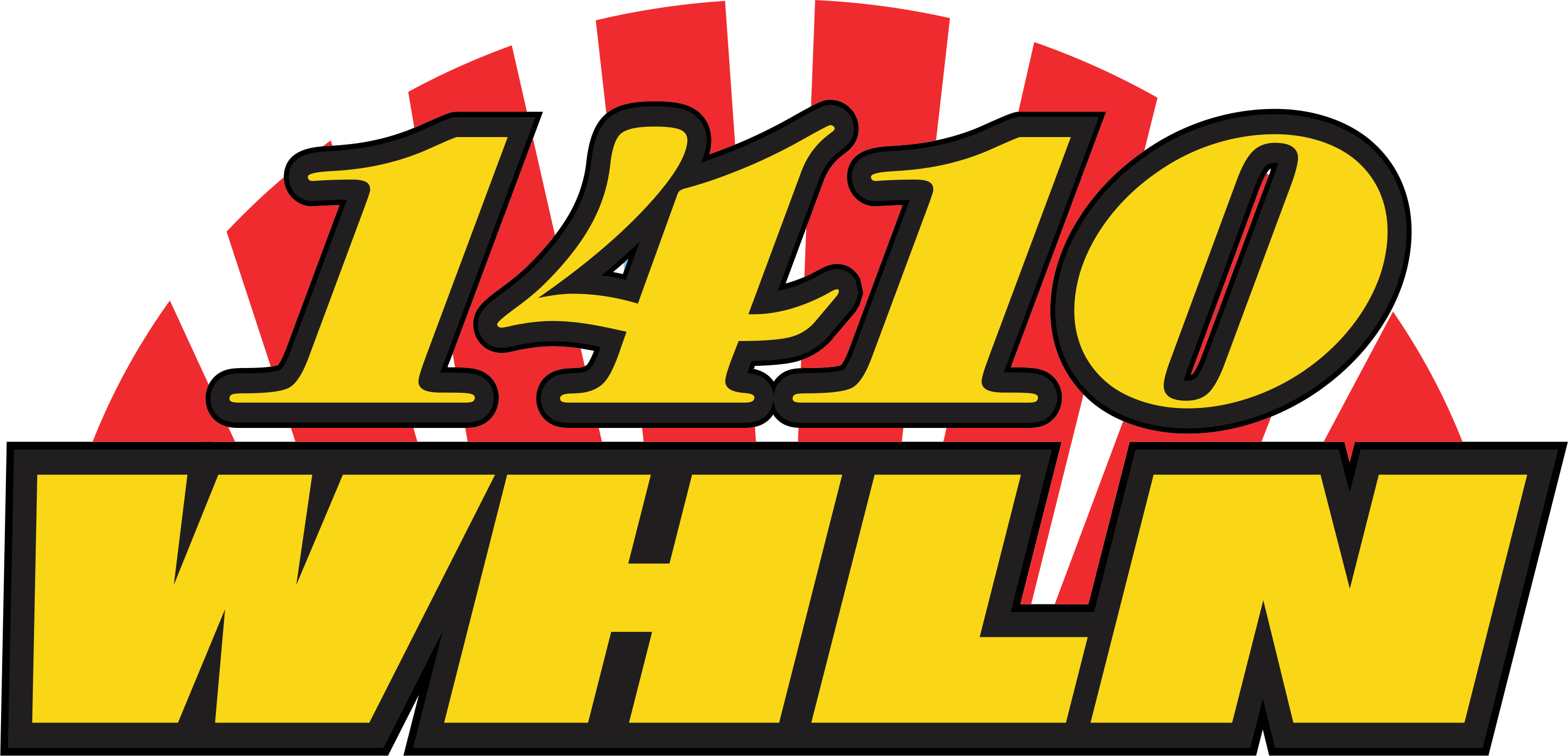
- Harlan, Kentucky; United States
- Frequency: 1410 kHz
- Branding: 1410 AM WHLN

Programming
- Format: Adult contemporary
- Affiliations: NBC News Radio; AP Radio

Ownership
- Owner: Eastern Broadcasting Company, Inc.

History
- First air date: May 28, 1941; 85 years ago

Technical information
- Licensing authority: FCC
- Facility ID: 54610
- Class: D
- Power: 5,000 watts (day); 41 watts (night)
- Transmitter coordinates: 36°50′59″N 83°23′41″W

Links
- Public license information: Public file; LMS
- Webcast: Listen live

WHLN (1410 AM) is a radio station broadcasting an adult contemporary format. Licensed to Harlan, Kentucky, United States, the station is owned by Eastern Broadcasting Company, Inc., as of October, 2024. It carries programming from NBC News Radio and AP Radio, as well as from the Kentucky Sports Network.

== History ==
WHLN Signed on the air on May 28, 1941.
