= Mount Pleasant, New Jersey =

Mount Pleasant, New Jersey may refer to several places:

- Mount Pleasant, Bergen County, New Jersey
- Mount Pleasant, Burlington County, New Jersey
- Mount Pleasant, Hunterdon County, New Jersey
- Mount Pleasant, Monmouth County, New Jersey
- Mount Pleasant, Newark, New Jersey
