= Attorney General Howard =

Attorney General Howard may refer to:

- John Curtois Howard (1887–1970), Attorney General of Ceylon
- Jacob M. Howard (1805–1871), Attorney General of Michigan
- Jeffrey R. Howard (born 1955), Attorney General of New Hampshire
- Volney Howard (1809–1889), Attorney General of Texas
