= Edwin Howard (architect) =

American architect

- Born: April 6, 1896; St. Louis, Missouri, United States
- Died: January 18, 1982 (aged 85); Westport, Connecticut, United States
- Occupation: Architect

Edwin Laclede Howard (April 6, 1896 – January 18, 1982) was an American architect. His work was part of the architecture event in the art competition at the 1932 Summer Olympics.
