= Patrick H. Rahilly House =

Historic house in Minnesota, United States

- U.S. National Register of Historic Places
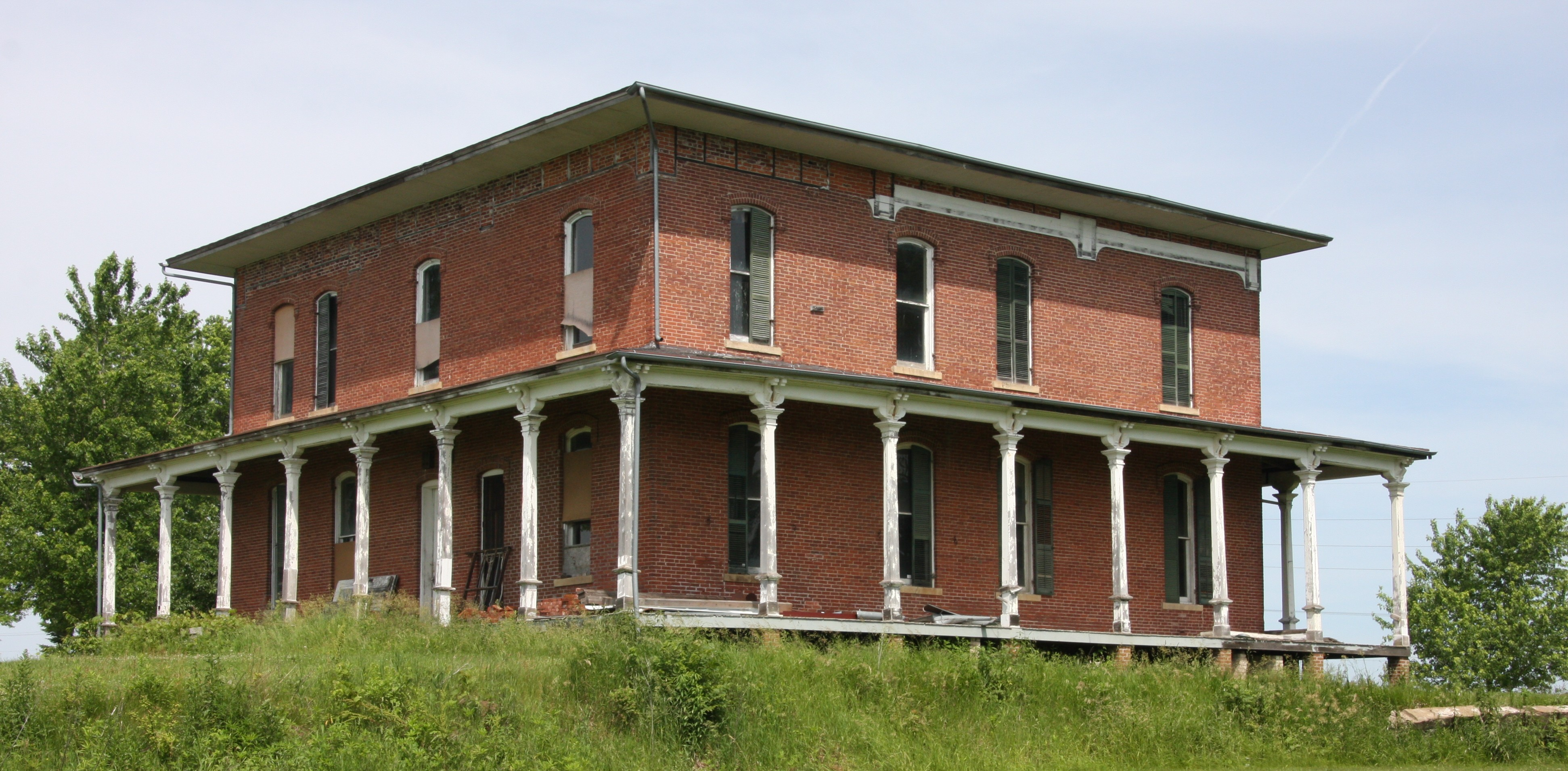
- The Patrick H. Rahilly House viewed from the southeast

- Location within Minnesota Location within the United States
- Location: 34057 County Road 15, Mount Pleasant Township, Minnesota
- Nearest city: Lake City, Minnesota
- Coordinates: 44°24′39.5″N 92°21′2.5″W
- Area: 1 acre (0.40 ha)
- Built: 1880
- Architectural style: Italianate
- NRHP reference No.: 75001032

Significant dates
- Boundary increase: March 2, 1979
- Designated: February 13, 1975

The Patrick H. Rahilly House is a historic house in Mount Pleasant Township, Minnesota, United States. It was built in 1880 for Patrick Henry Rahilly (1832–1931), one of southern Minnesota's earliest and most successful farmers and entrepreneurs, who went on to serve in the state legislature. The house was listed on the National Register of Historic Places in 1975 for its state-level significance in the themes of architecture and politics/government. It was nominated for its associations with Rahilly and for its exemplary Italianate architecture atypically located in a rural setting.

During a long period of vacancy, the Rahilly House deteriorated from repeated storm damage. On July 26, 2018, Jason Reese purchased the property with intentions to restore the property to its original grandeur.

== See also ==
- National Register of Historic Places listings in Wabasha County, Minnesota
