= Russell D. Howard =

United States general

Brigadier General (Ret.) Russell D. Howard
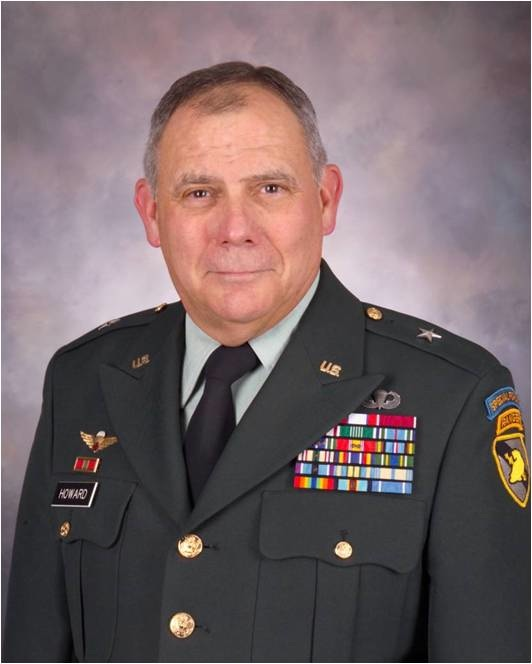

Academic background
- Education: San Jose State University (B.S.); University of Maryland (B.A.); National Chengchi University; Monterey Institute of International Studies (M.A.); Harvard University (M.P.A.)
- Military Career
- Allegiance: United States of America
- Branch: United States Army; Army Reserve
- Service years: 1970-2005
- Rank: Brigadier General
- Nickname: Russ
- Commands: Alpha Team, 7th Special Forces Group; 1st Special Forces Group (Airborne); 3rd Battalion, 1st Special Warfare Training Group; C.P.O., 1st Special Forces Command (Airborne); S.A.C., United States Southern Command; D.C.O.S., I Corps
- Conflicts: Cold War; Vietnam War; Persian Gulf War; UNOSOM II; Combined Joint Task Force Haiti / Haitian Advisory Group; War on terrorism
- Awards: Army Distinguished Service Medal; Legion of Merit

Russell D. Howard is a veteran officer of the United States Army Special Forces, professor of international studies and terrorism studies, writer, and counterterrorism strategist. He held the command of the Airborne 1st Special Forces Group at Fort Lewis and also created the Combating Terrorism Center at West Point. From 2012 to 2014, Howard was the director of the Monterey Terrorism Research and Education Program (MonTREP) at the Monterey Institute of International Studies (MIIS), where he served as an adjunct professor for over a decade. He has owned cattle ranches in California and Minnesota. He is the director of a company called Howard Consulting Services, and a Senior Fellow at Joint Special Operations University. He is fluent in Mandarin and German.

== Military career ==
General Howard served as an "A" Team commander in the 7th Special Forces Group from 1970 to 1972. He left the active component and then served in the United States Army Reserve from 1972 to 1980. During this period he served as an overseas manager for American International Underwriters in Melbourne, Australia, and the China tour manager for Canadian Pacific Airlines. He was recalled to active duty in 1980, and served initially in Korea as an infantry company commander. Subsequent assignments included classified project officer, U.S. Army 1st Special Operations Command, at Fort Bragg, and operations officer and company commander, 1st Battalion, 1st Special Forces Group in Okinawa, Japan.

Howard was head of the Department of Social Sciences and the founding director of the Combating Terrorism Center at West Point. His previous positions include deputy department head of the Department of Social Sciences, Army Chief of Staff Fellow at the Center for International Affairs at Harvard University, and commander of the 1st Special Forces Group (Airborne) at Fort Lewis, Washington. Other assignments include assistant to the special representative to the secretary general during UNOSOM II in Somalia, deputy chief of staff for I Corps, and chief of staff and deputy commander for the Combined Joint Task Force, Haiti/Haitian Advisory Group. Previously, Howard was commander of 3d Battalion, 1st Special Warfare Training Group (Airborne) at Fort Bragg, North Carolina. He served as the Administrative Assistant to Admiral Stansfield Turner and as a special assistant to the commander of United States Southern Command. Howard was the founding director of the Jebsen Center for Counterterrorism Studies at The Fletcher School, before leaving in September 2008.

== Books and publications ==
- Terrorism and Counterterrorism: Understanding the New Security Environment, Readings and Interpretations, Russell D. Howard, Reid L. Sawyer and Natasha Bajema (2003)
  - Revised & Updated (2008)
- Defeating Terrorism, Russell D. Howard, Reid L. Sawyer
- Homeland Security and Terrorism, Russell D. Howard, James Forest, Joanne Moore (2005)
- Terrorism and Weapons of Mass Destruction. Russell D. Howard and James J.F. Forest (Eds). With Natasha E. Bajema
- Intelligence in Denied Areas: Russell D. Howard
- Northeast Asia Regional Security and the United States Military: Context, Presence, and Roles, Susan F. Bryant, Russell D. Howard, Jay M. Parker, and Albert S. Wilner, INSS Occasional Paper 47, November 2002, USAF Institute for National Security Studies, USAF Academy, Colorado
- The Chinese People's Liberation Army: "Short Arms and Slow Legs," Russell D. Howard, INSS Occasional Paper 28, Regional Security Series, September 1999, USAF Institute for National Security Studies, USAF Academy, Colorado
- Thinking Creatively in the War on Terrorism – Leveraging NATO and the Partnership for Peace Consortium
- Intelligence in Denied Spaces: New Concepts for a Changing Security Environment (2007)
- Educating Special Forces Junior Leaders for a Complex Security Environment (2009)
- Cultural and Linguistic Skills Acquisition for Special Forces: Necessity, Acceleration, and Potential Alternatives (2011)
- The Nexus of Extremism and Trafficking: Scourge of the World or So Much Hype? (2013), and The Asia Pivot: Implica- tions for U.S. Special Operations Forces (2016)
