= Mount Pleasant Historic District (Boston, Massachusetts) =

Historic district in Massachusetts, United States

- U.S. National Register of Historic Places
- U.S. Historic district
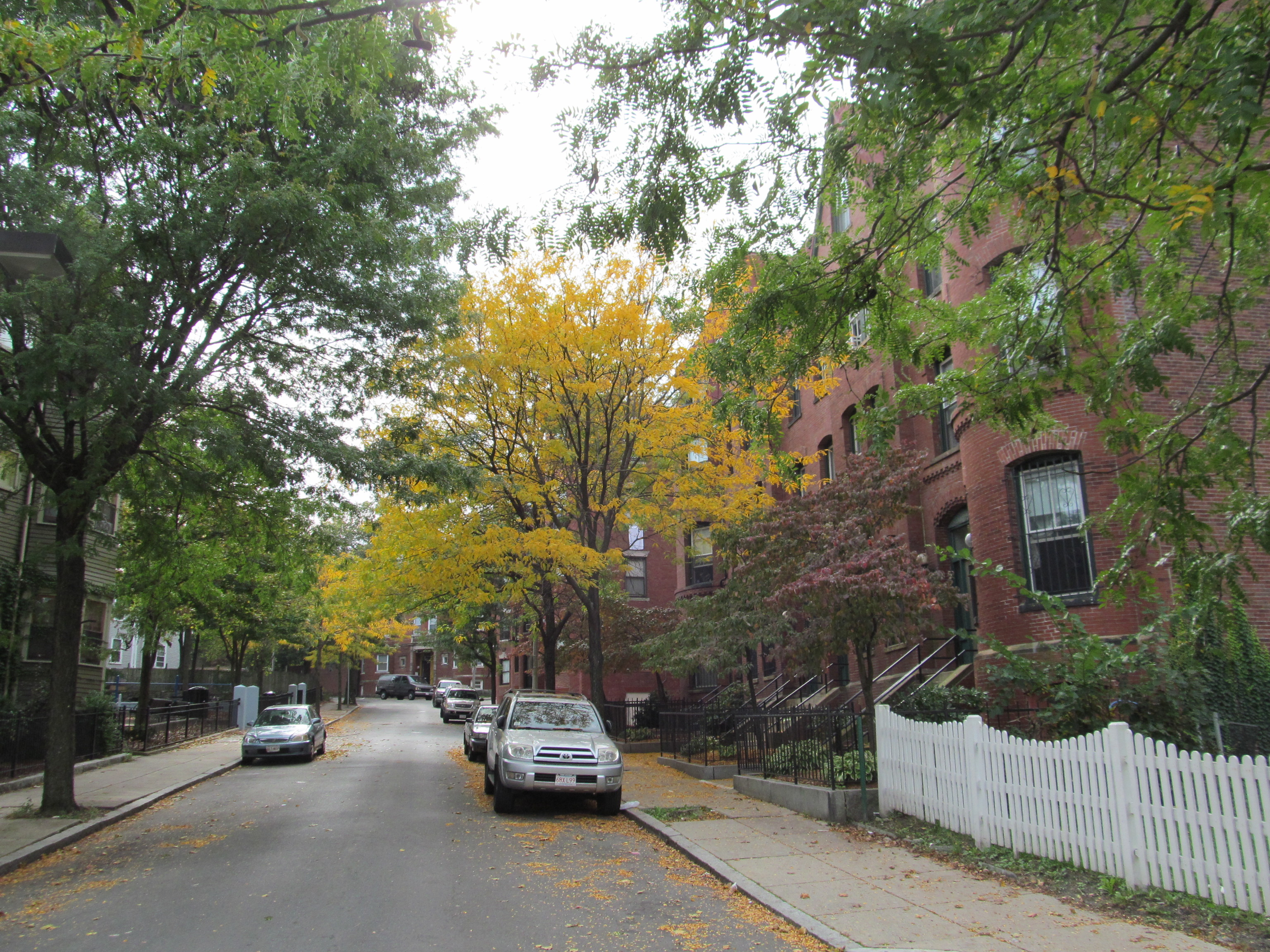
- Mount Pleasant Avenue

- Location within Massachusetts Location within the United States
- Location: Boston, Massachusetts
- Coordinates: 42°19′33″N 71°4′43″W
- Area: 170 acres (69 ha)
- Architectural style: Greek Revival, Italianate, Romanesque
- NRHP reference No.: 89000004
- Added to NRHP: February 9, 1989

Mount Pleasant Historic District is a historic district encompassing a cluster of well-preserved 19th-century residential buildings on Forest Street and Mount Pleasant Avenue in the Roxbury neighborhood of Boston, Massachusetts. First developed in 1833, it was one Roxbury's first speculative residential subdivision developments. The district features Greek Revival, Italianate, and Romanesque architecture, and was added to the National Register of Historic Places in 1989.

== Description and history ==
The Mount Pleasant Historic District covers about 170 acres (69 ha) in central Roxbury, and includes all of the properties on Mount Pleasant Avenue and Forest Street south of Dudley Street, as well as the properties on Vine Street between the two. The area is entirely residential, including a diversity of housing types and styles. It has structures containing one, two, and three units, as well as larger apartment houses and rowhouses. The only institutional building in the district, the Mount Carmel Convent, is also residential. Most of the smaller buildings are wood-frame structures, while the larger buildings are generally built out of brick. Stylistically, the oldest buildings are Greek Revival in character, with styles extending the full gamut of popular styles of the second half of the 19th century.

Roxbury was founded as a separate town in 1630, and was annexed to Boston in 1868. Until the 19th century, it was a predominantly agricultural area. In 1833, Caleb Parker Jr. purchased the farm of Moses White, and laid out the streets of the district and the surrounding area. Land that he sold to builders came with deed restrictions limiting it to residential construction. Public transit from the area to Boston was at first limited to horse-drawn omnibuses, but the train was built through Roxbury in 1835, reducing commute times. Prior to the American Civil War, most of the construction in the district was wood-frame, albeit with increasing density. Construction after the war was mainly in brick, and at even higher densities, although a few triple deckers were built around the turn of the 20th century.

== See also ==
- National Register of Historic Places listings in southern Boston
