= Mount Pleasant Commercial Historic District (Mount Pleasant, Utah) =

Historic district in Utah, United States

- U.S. National Register of Historic Places
- U.S. Historic district
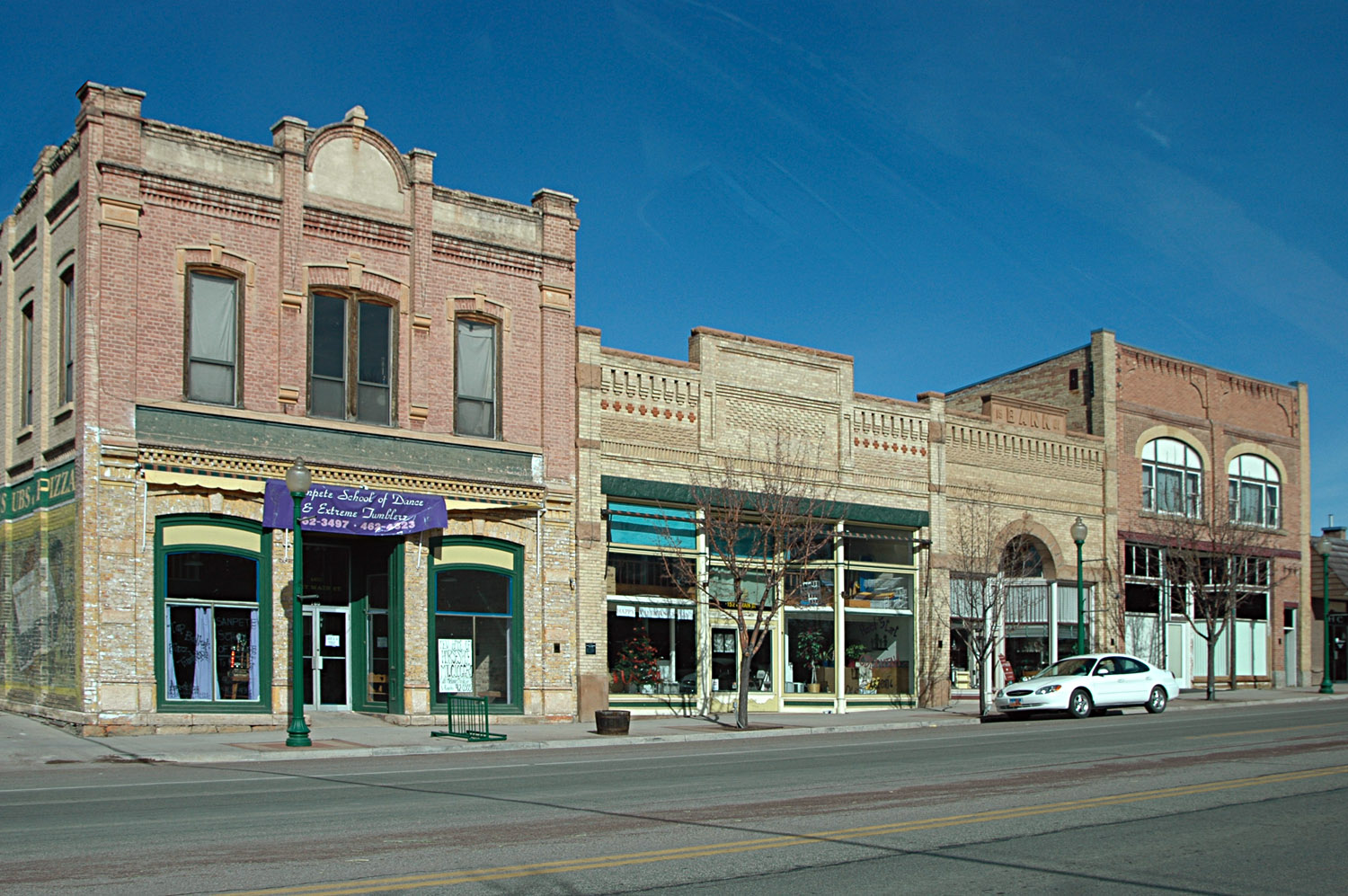
- Buildings in the district

- Location within Utah Location within the United States
- Location: U.S. Route 89 and State Route 116, Mount Pleasant, Utah
- Coordinates: 39°32′46″N 111°27′22″W
- Built: 1875
- Architect: Multiple
- Architectural style: Early Commercial, Stick/Eastlake, Romanesque
- NRHP reference No.: 79002508
- Added to NRHP: October 26, 1979

Mount Pleasant Commercial Historic District is a historic district located in Mount Pleasant, Utah, United States. Consisting of buildings along U.S. Route 89 and State Route 116, it was listed on the National Register of Historic Places in 1979.
