= Edwin B. Howard =

United States Army general

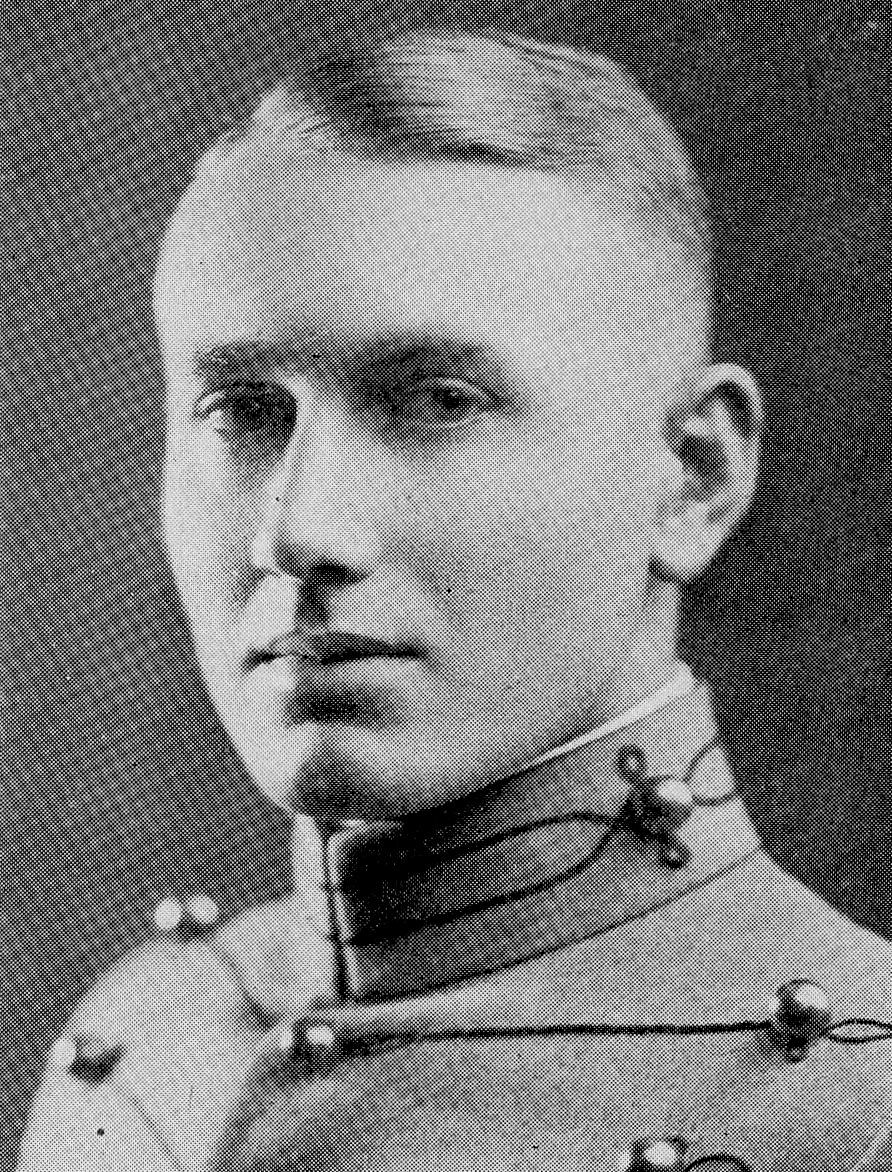
- At West Point in 1923
- Born: Edwin Britain Howard; December 26, 1901; Harlan, Kentucky
- Died: January 29, 1993 (aged 91); Naples, Florida
- Burial place: Resthaven Cemetery
- Education: United States Military Academy; Command and General Staff School
- Occupation: Military officer

Edwin Britain Howard (December 26, 1901 – January 29, 1993) was a brigadier general in the United States Army.

== Biography ==
Edwin B. Howard was born in Harlan, Kentucky on December 26, 1901. He graduated from the United States Military Academy in 1923. From 1935 to 1937, Howard attended Infantry and Tank School at Fort Benning, Georgia. From 1937 to 1938, he attended Command and General Staff School at Fort Leavenworth, Kansas.

During the Second World War, Howard was Assistant Chief of Staff for Intelligence in the Fifth United States Army under General Mark Wayne Clark.

From 1951 to 1954 Howard was Chief of Intelligence of the Allied Land Forces in Central Europe.

Upon his retirement from the Army in 1954, Howard became a consultant for the Immigration and Naturalization Service (INS). Due to his intelligence experience, the INS Commissioner, General J.M. Swing, wanted Howard to become Assistant Commissioner. This required a special bill from Congress because former military officers were prohibited by law from holding positions in the INS. The bill was passed, despite the opposition of some Congressmen who felt the INS was being taken over by the military.

Howard died in Naples, Florida on December 29, 1993, and was buried at Resthaven Cemetery in Keith, Kentucky.
