= Mount Pleasant Township, Wabasha County, Minnesota =

Mount Pleasant Township, Minnesota
- Township
- Location within the state of Minnesota Mount Pleasant Township, Minnesota (the United States)
- Coordinates: 44°24′39″N 92°21′0″W
- Country: United States
- State: Minnesota
- County: Wabasha

Area
  - Total: 36.0 sq mi (93.2 km^{2})
  - Land: 36.0 sq mi (93.2 km^{2})
  - Water: 0 sq mi (0.0 km^{2})
- Elevation: 1,099 ft (335 m)

Population (2000)
  - Total: 475
  - Density: 13/sq mi (5.1/km^{2})
- Time zone: UTC-6 (Central (CST))
  - Summer (DST): UTC-5 (CDT)
- ZIP code: 55041
- Area code: 651
- FIPS code: 27-44620
- GNIS feature ID: 0665057

Mount Pleasant Township is a township in Wabasha County, Minnesota, in the United States. The population was 475 at the 2000 census.

Mount Pleasant Township was organized in 1858, and so named on account of the scenic overlooks from area summits.

== Geography ==
According to the United States Census Bureau, the township has a total area of 36.0 square miles (93.2 km^{2}), all of it land. The township contains two properties listed on the National Register of Historic Places: the 1858 Lake City and Rochester Stage Road–Mount Pleasant Section and the 1880 Patrick H. Rahilly House.

== Demographics ==
As of the census of 2000, there were 475 people, 153 households, and 128 families residing in the township. The population density was 13.2 people per square mile (5.1/km^{2}). There were 158 housing units at an average density of 4.4/sq mi (1.7/km^{2}). The racial makeup of the township was 98.95% White, 0.21% Native American, 0.63% Asian, 0.21% from other races. Hispanic or Latino of any race were 0.21% of the population.

There were 153 households, out of which 49.0% had children under the age of 18 living with them, 72.5% were married couples living together, 3.9% had a female householder with no husband present, and 15.7% were non-families. 13.7% of all households were made up of individuals, and 4.6% had someone living alone who was 65 years of age or older. The average household size was 3.10 and the average family size was 3.40.

In the township the population was spread out, with 34.1% under the age of 18, 9.1% from 18 to 24, 28.2% from 25 to 44, 21.7% from 45 to 64, and 6.9% who were 65 years of age or older. The median age was 32 years. For every 100 females, there were 119.9 males. For every 100 females age 18 and over, there were 114.4 males.

The median income for a household in the township was $40,625, and the median income for a family was $46,071. Males had a median income of $32,500 versus $20,750 for females. The per capita income for the township was $16,591. About 6.3% of families and 9.5% of the population were below the poverty line, including 14.0% of those under age 18 and 6.5% of those age 65 or over.
