= Mount Pleasant, Johnson County, Indiana =

- Unincorporated community
- Location within Indiana Location within the United States
- Coordinates: 39°27′37″N 86°07′10″W
- Country: United States
- State: Indiana
- County: Johnson
- Township: Franklin
- Elevation: 774 ft (236 m)
- ZIP code: 46131
- FIPS code: 18-51570
- GNIS feature ID: 439639

Mount Pleasant is an unincorporated community in Franklin Township, Johnson County, Indiana.
