= Mountpleasant railway station =

Railway station in Ireland

Mountpleasant
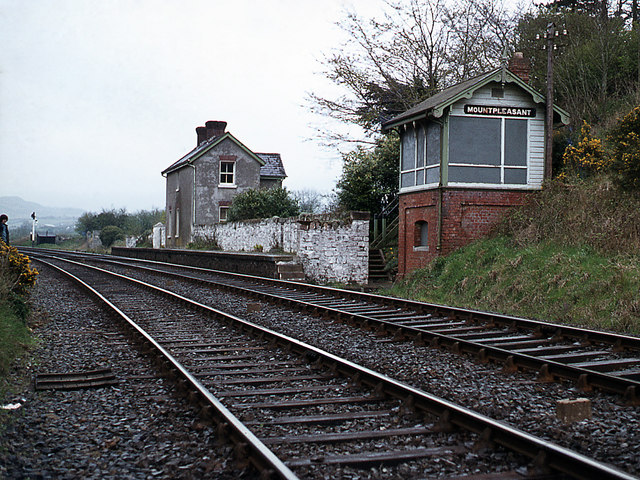
- Mountpleasant station on 3 August 1974, after closure and before demolition

General information
- Location: Mountpleasant; County Louth; Ireland
- Coordinates: 54.0473°N 6.3775°W
- Line: Dublin–Belfast railway line
- Platforms: 1
- Tracks: 2

Construction
- Structure type: At-grade

History
- Original company: Dublin and Belfast Junction Railway
- Pre-grouping: Great Northern Railway (Ireland)

Key dates
- July 1850: Opened as Plaster
- 1851: Renamed Mount Pleasant and Jonesborough
- 1855: Renamed Mount Pleasant
- November 1865: Closed
- 1887: Permanently closed

Historical railways
Preceding station	Historical railways	Following station
Dundalk; Line and station open	Great Northern Railway (Ireland); Belfast–Dublin	Bessbrook; Line open, station reopened as Newry
Route map
Location
- Location within Ireland Location within island of Ireland

Mountpleasant railway station (also written as Mount Pleasant) was a railway station in northern County Louth, Ireland, on the Dublin–Belfast railway line. Originally opened as Plaster in July 1850, it was renamed twice before closing permanently in 1887.

The station was located north of Dundalk, near Ravensdale, Aghnaskeagh and the border with Northern Ireland.

== History ==
=== Opening and railway operations ===
Mountpleasant station opened in July 1850 as Plaster, when the Dublin and Belfast Junction Railway extended its line northwards from Dundalk. In 1851, it was renamed Mount Pleasant and Jonesborough, before becoming simply Mount Pleasant in 1855.

The station closed in November 1865 but subsequently reopened. It closed permanently in 1887, although the railway line remained operational.

Mountpleasant was unusual in having only one passenger platform, on the eastern side of the railway, serving the line towards Dublin. A siding was provided on the opposite side of the line.

The station came under the management of the Great Northern Railway (Ireland) following its formation in 1876. A signal box was constructed during the period 1877–1903, designed under the supervision of GNR(I) chief civil engineer William Hemingway Mills.

=== Closure and demolition ===
Although the station closed to passengers in 1887, its railway buildings remained beside the operational Dublin–Belfast main line for many years.

Photographs from 1959 and 1974 show the former station buildings after closure. The surviving structures were subsequently demolished during the 1970s.

The 2007 industrial heritage survey for Louth County Council found no visible remains of the station building, platform, signal box or former loading facilities. However, part of a wrought-iron level crossing gate and its supporting stone pillars survived to the north of the former station site.

The Dublin–Belfast railway line remains in operation through the former station site.
