= Mount Pleasant, Saint John, U.S. Virgin Islands =

Human settlement in United States Virgin Islands, United States of America

Coordinates: 18.35579°N 64.73653°W

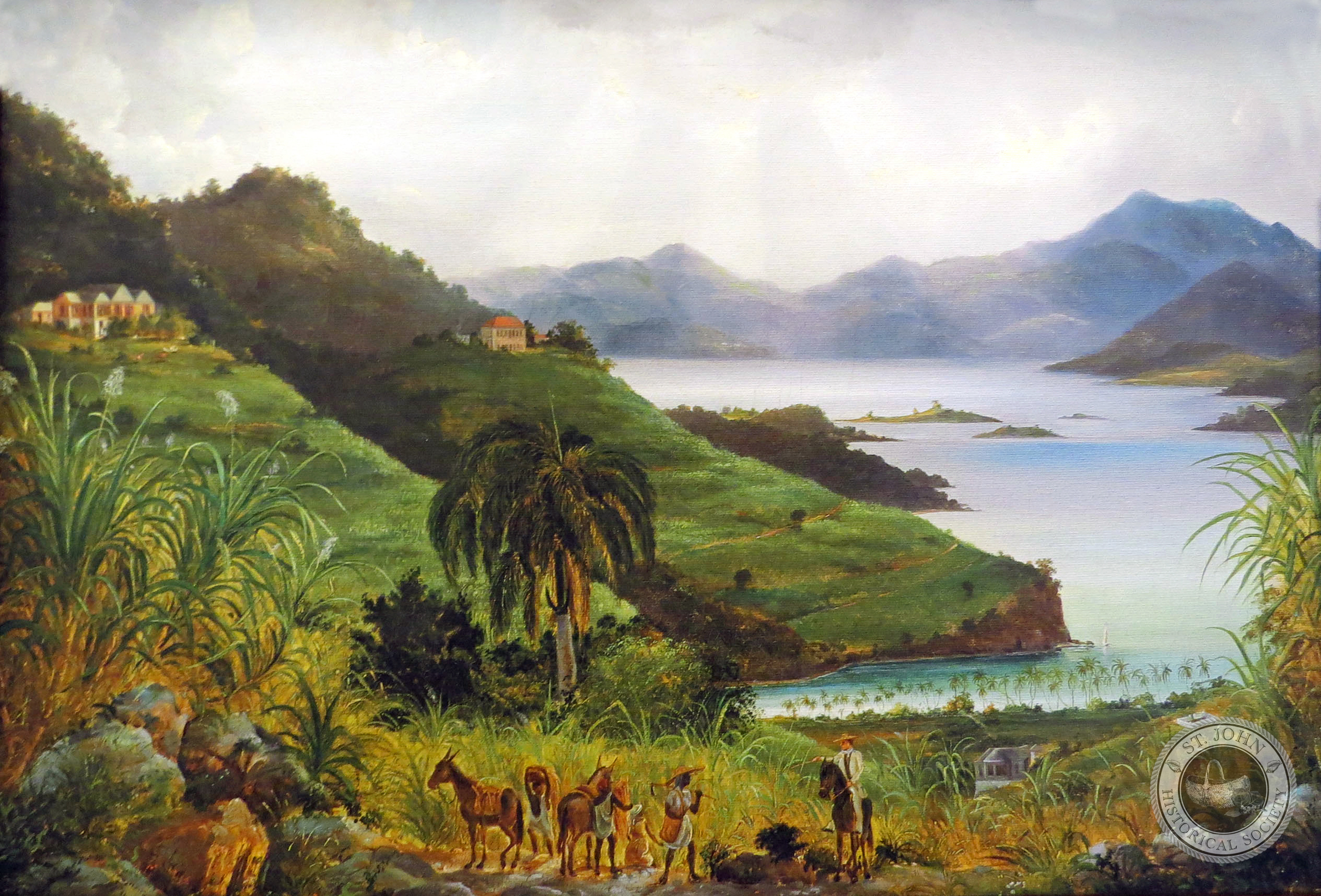
Overview of Maho Bay wih the Mount Pleasant, America Hill and Wintherg estate house, 1852.

Mount Pleasant is an area of Virgin Islands National Park on the island of Saint John in the United States Virgin Islands. It is located between Maho Bay and Centerline Road. This area is uninhabited and its name has fallen out of use.
