= Mount Pleasant, Saint Croix, U.S. Virgin Islands =

Mount Pleasant, United States Virgin Islands
- Village
- Location within Saint Croix, U.S. Virgin Islands Location within the U.S. Virgin Islands
- Coordinates: 17.74581°N 64.80070°W
- Country: United States Virgin Islands
- Island: Saint Croix
- Time zone: UTC-4 (AST)

Mount Pleasant, Saint Croix is a settlement on the island of Saint Croix in the United States Virgin Islands.

== History ==
In 1816, Mount Pleasanf (Northside Quarter B. No. 11, Centre Police District, Christiansteds Jurisdiction) covered 150 acres of which 72 acres were planted with sugar cane and 78 acres were under other cultivation. 53 enslaved labourers were present on the estyate.

On 13 September 1817, Nount Pleasant was sold by William B. Carden to Peter de Nully. On 10 August 1830, it was sold by auction to Insinger &, Co., for Rd. 1,000. On 1 January 1831, it was sold by Insinger & Co. to John Drummond for Rd. 5,025. 1 July 1839, 130 acres of this property (with Estate Betzy's Jevvel) was sold by John Drummond, to Thomas Eccles, for Ps. 2,000. Drummond retains 20 acres, which surround the house. These 20 acres were sold to Estate Libanon Hili in 1856 as Little Mount Pleasant. On 27 July 1843, 130 acres and Estate Betzy's Jewell were sold at auction to the Royal Treasury, for Ps. 12,000. 31 January 1852, these 130 acres and Betzy's Jewell were sold at auction to Clement Skelton, for $ 6,700. 28.5 acres were sold by Clement Skelton to George Behagen, in 1856, for $ 185. On 10 September 1856, T. Skelton inherited the estate.

The plantation was later owned by one planter Nordby. He lived on Saint Croix from 1899 to 1924. He initially lived at Lowry Hill but later moved to Mount Pleasant. He was the father of the medical doctor Rudolph Nordby.
