= National Eagle Center =

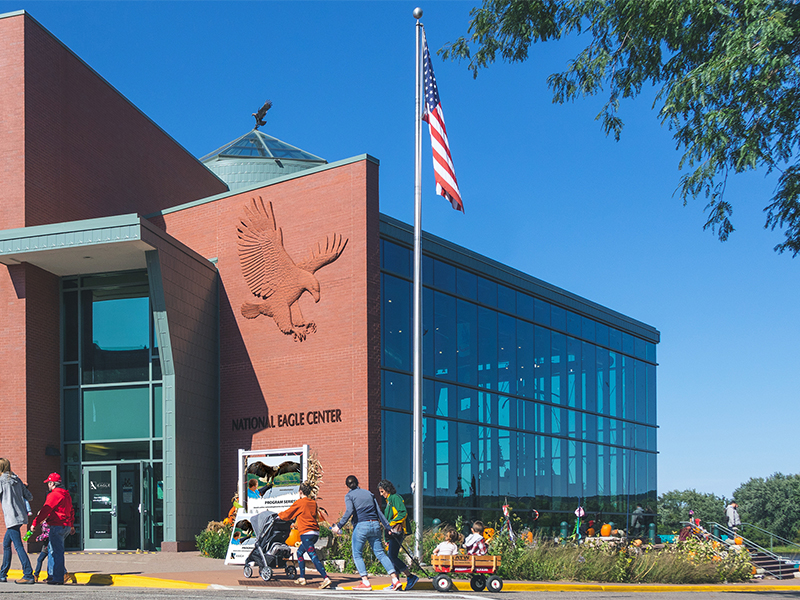
- Entrance to National Eagle Center Riverfront Building
- Established: 1999; 27 years ago
- Location: 50 Pembroke Ave S. Wabasha, Minnesota, United States
- Coordinates: 44.384441°N 92.031305°W
- Type: Interpretive center
- Visitors: 85,000 (2018)
- Director: Open
- Website: www.nationaleaglecenter.org

The National Eagle Center is a nonprofit educational, interpretive center and museum located on the banks of the Mississippi River in Wabasha, Minnesota, United States, that focuses on education about eagles and the Upper Mississippi River watershed. In addition to opportunities to view wild eagles throughout the year from viewing decks, non-releasable bald eagles are on exhibit at the center as well as interactive exhibits on eagle science and history.

== History ==
The site is located where hundreds of bald eagles congregate to scavenge and hunt fish year round due to a geographic anomaly at the confluence of the Mississippi and Chippewa Rivers. The Chippewa River's sedimentary deposits formed a delta creating Lake Pepin, a naturally occurring lake on the Mississippi formed by the backup of water. The fast running water exiting the Chippewa delta prevents ice from being able to form on much of the Mississippi River in that area during the winter making it a good fishing ground for migrating eagles.

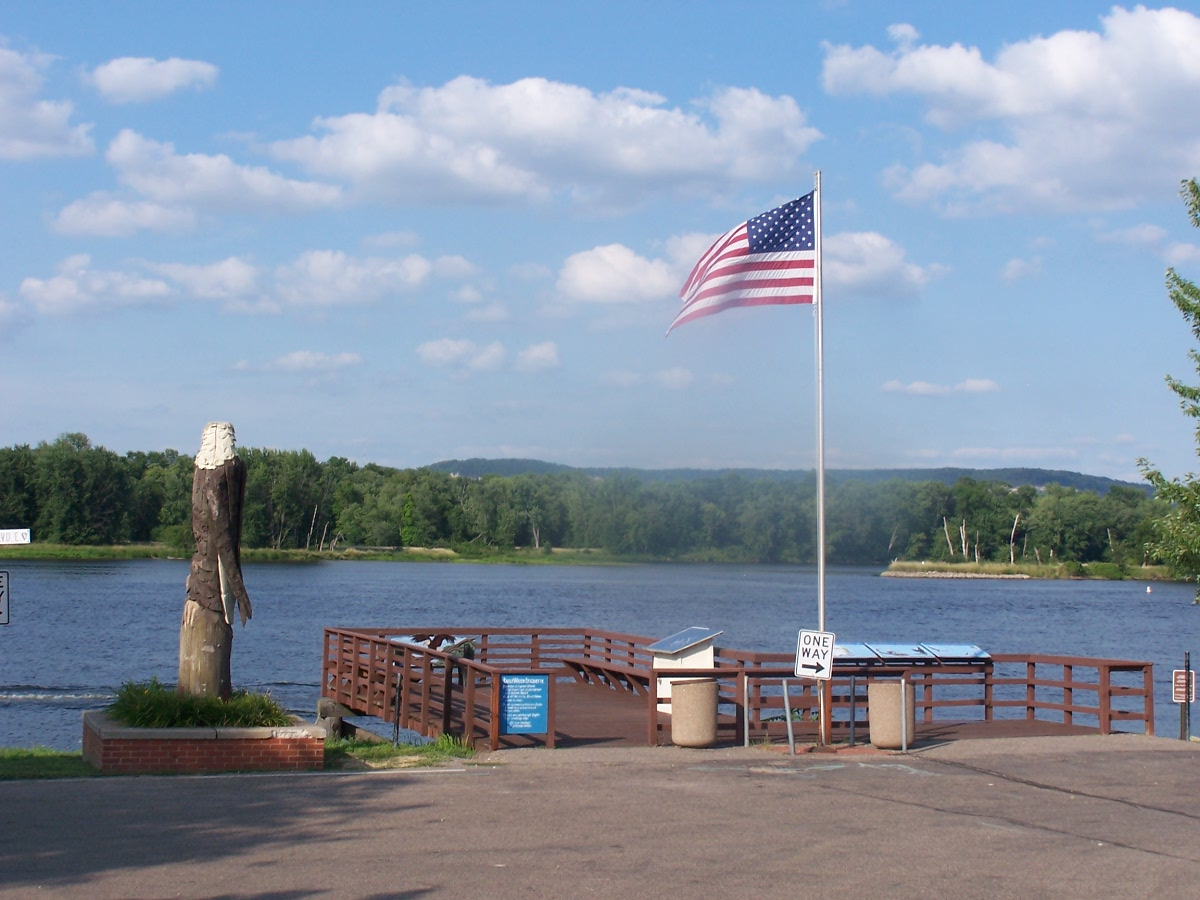
Original eagle observation deck in 2006

In 1989, an informal group of local volunteers called EagleWatch led by Mary Rivers partnered with the Wabasha Chamber of Commerce to develop an abandoned deck built for paddleboats to disembark passengers on the river for eagle enthusiasts coming to see bald eagles. In their first year of operation they tallied more than a thousand people who showed up in the middle of winter to look at bald eagles.

In 1989, EagleWatch incorporated as a nonprofit and worked with the City of Wabasha which functioned as the fiscal agent for both State and Federal funds. The National Eagle Center received Federal recognition in 1998 which cleared the way for the U.S. Army Corps of Engineers, the Fish and Wildlife Service and other agencies to assist in its development. The City of Wabasha later dropped its cooperative venture with EagleWatch to manage the Eagle Center, partnering instead with the National Audubon Society. In June 1999 the City of Wabasha contracted with the National Audubon Society to take over operations of the National Eagle Center from EagleWatch for eighteen months but later declined to renew the contract and "severed the ties" when it was discovered that most of the membership fees and donations raised were going to the support the National Audubon Society's State and National programs rather than to the National Eagle Center. The city was also alarmed over the National Audubon Society's decision to change the vision of the project substantially. The City of Wabasha then resumed its partnership with EagleWatch to take over the management of the National Eagle Center in July 2001.

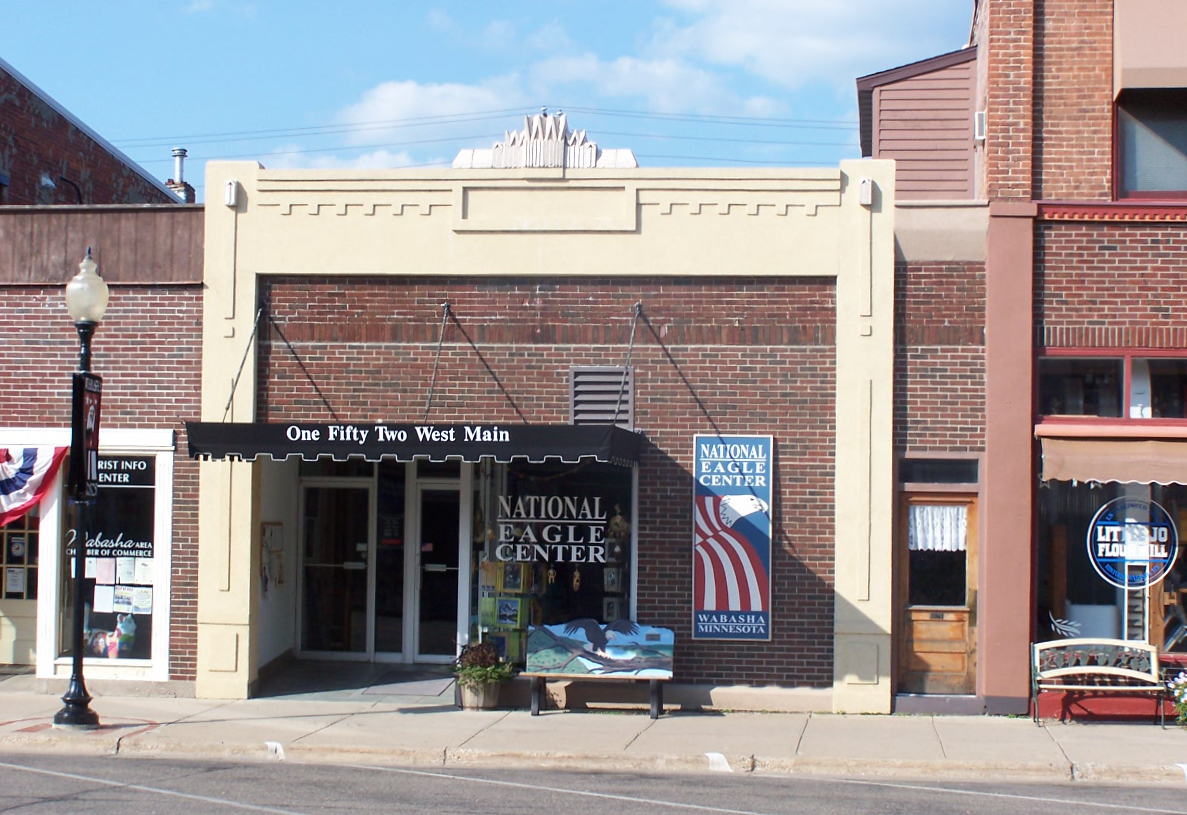
National Eagle Center's former location on Main Street in 2006

In 1999, under its then executive director Mary Beth Garrigan, the National Eagle Center opened a temporary year-round interpretive center in downtown Wabasha in a storefront building that formerly housed a bar. The center included two live permanently injured and non-releasable bald eagles, named Harriet and Angel.

In May 2007, in a partnership with the City of Wabasha, the National Eagle Center opened 14,200-square-foot (1,320 m^{2}) interpretive center on the banks of the Mississippi River on the site of the Big Jo Flour Mill at the corner of Pembroke Avenue and Lawrence Boulevard in Wabasha. The facility, designed by LHB, Inc., includes a living aviary, environmental and cultural exhibits, classrooms, auditorium, indoor and outdoor viewing space, and gift shop. In its new building the National Eagle Center provides programming on Environmental Stewardship, Native American history, the culture of the region, and the important symbolic role of the bald eagle in the American military.

== Facilities ==
=== Aviary and eagles ===
The National Eagle Center, which houses both permanently injured and non-releasable bald call their resident eagles "ambassadors." The eagles are housed in a climate-controlled interior aviary with glass panels that allow visitors to watch the eagles from a distance. Visitors are also able to enter the aviary when permitted.

Eagle ambassadors

- Angel - Found on the ground with a broken wing near Grantsburg, WI 1999. Arrived at the Center in 2000.
- Was'aka - Blind in his left eye due to a tumor, since removed. Was found wandering a beach outside of Jacksonville, FL in 2006. Arrived at the Center in 2009.
- Latsch - Blind in his left eye. Was found in the summer of 2016 on the ground near Winona, MN. Arrived at the Center in 2018.
- Perseus - Traumatic left wing injury (cause unknown). Rescued in the summer of 2021 in Audrain County, MO. He was treated by the Raptor Rehabilitation Project of the University of Missouri. Arrived at the Center in 2023.

==== Past eagle ambassadors ====
Bald eagle

- Harriet - The first eagle ambassador and arrived at the National Eagle Center in 2000. A vehicle collision in 1998 left her left wing badly dislocated and was partly amputated. Harriet died in May 2016 at the age of 35.
- Columbia - Injured in a vehicle collision that fractured her right shoulder and was found to have nearly twice the lethal dose of lead in her blood. Arrived at the Center in 2003. Columbia died in January 2024 at the age of 22 due to complications resulting from her lead exposure.

Golden eagle

- Donald - Hit by a car and his right wing was broken in two places. Arrived at the Center in 2008. He died on March 16, 2020, due to suspected complications of a stroke.

=== Riverfront Amphitheater ===
In 2023 the National Eagle Center debuted the new Riverfront Amphitheater. This community venue, developed in partnership with the City of Wabasha can seat approximately 250 people and is used for outdoor eagle programs during the summer season. It is also used for private events and concerts and is administered by the National Eagle Center.

=== Cultural Connections Gallery ===
The exhibit features a buffalo hide depicting the Dakota creation story and a video commentary featuring the Mexican-American artist Javier Lara-Ruiz (who painted under the Inkpa Mani), the staff of the National Eagle Center (gifted by the Prairie Island Indian Community), a land acknowledgment, and the story of the Dakota People of the Prairie Island Indian Community.

=== American Eagle Gallery ===
The American Eagle Gallery is the permanent home and exhibition space for the Preston Cook American Eagle Collection. The collection was amassed over more than 60 years by real estate developer and American eagle advocate Preston Cook who donated it to the center. It features curated, regularly updated exhibits showcasing items from the vast 40,000+ piece collection, including original works by John James Audubon, historical pieces, government artifacts, and items from pop-culture, commerce, and the military.

=== Past exhibits ===
Native American artifact exhibit

The Dakota Family Theater featured ancestral artifacts of the late Jim Stokes, a descendant of Chief Wapasha III and an active supporter of the Eagle Center. The objects are in a darkened room, when people are present, a light over an item will comes on and the recorded voice of Stokes provides information on the object, then the light will dim and another will activate featuring another object.

=== Observation decks ===
The facility provides an exterior 25' high deck, as well as a river-level deck for viewing bald eagles complete with spotting scopes provide opportunity to view wild eagles over the adjoining Mississippi River and backwaters, as well as river traffic and other species of wildlife.

=== Other facilities ===
- Classrooms, lecture facilities and community gathering area
- Exhibit areas to allow a variety of exhibits

- preserved animal specimens
- preserved birds in flight

== Events ==
SOAR with the Eagles

SOAR With the Eagles is a three-part annual festival that takes place during one weekend in March, June, and September and celebrates the Bald Eagle spring migration along the Mississippi River. The festival includes wild eagle viewing, animal presentations, flying bird shows, special exhibits, and educational programs.

== Directors ==
- Heidi Hughes, 1996-1998
- Mary Beth Garrigan, 2000-2012
- Rolf Thompson, 2012-2019
- Meg Gammage-Tucker, 2020–2023
- Karlin Symons (Interim), 2023–2024
- Edward Minnema, 2024-2025

== Gallery ==
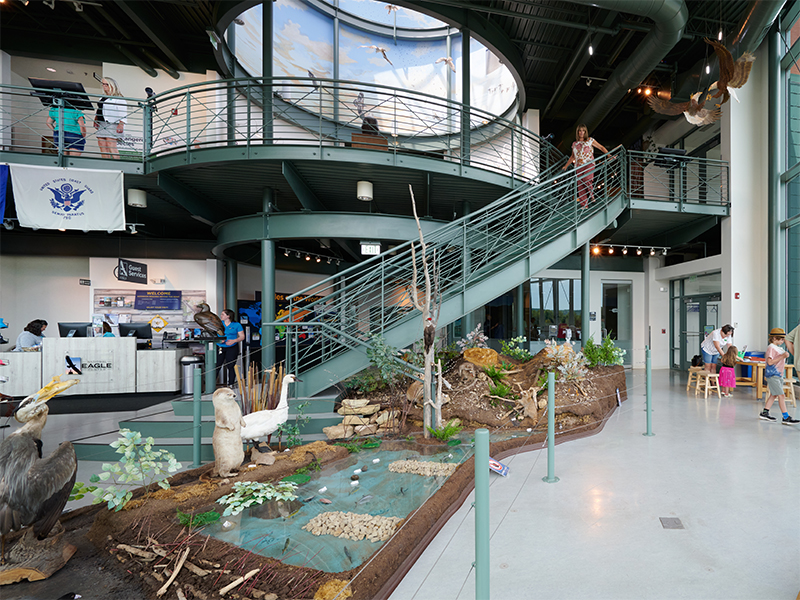
View of National Eagle Center 1st floor.

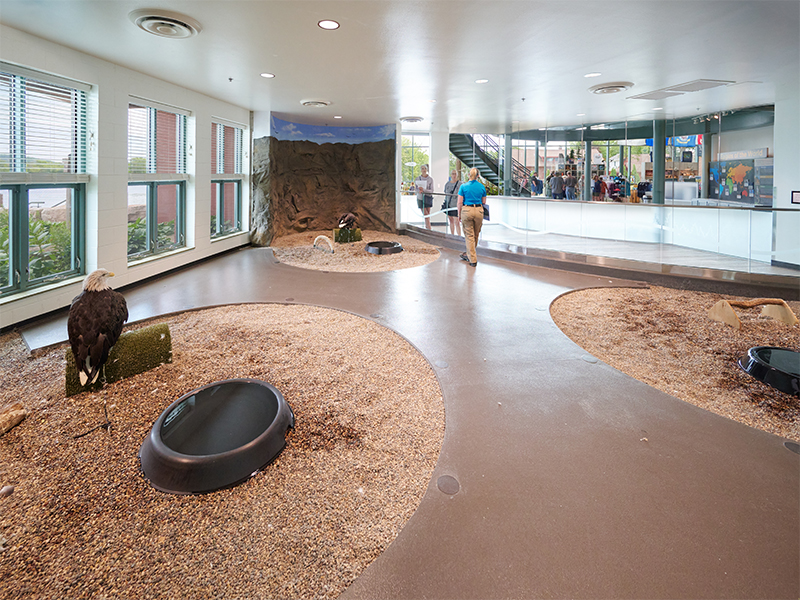
Eagle display area, aka "Ambassador Avenue".

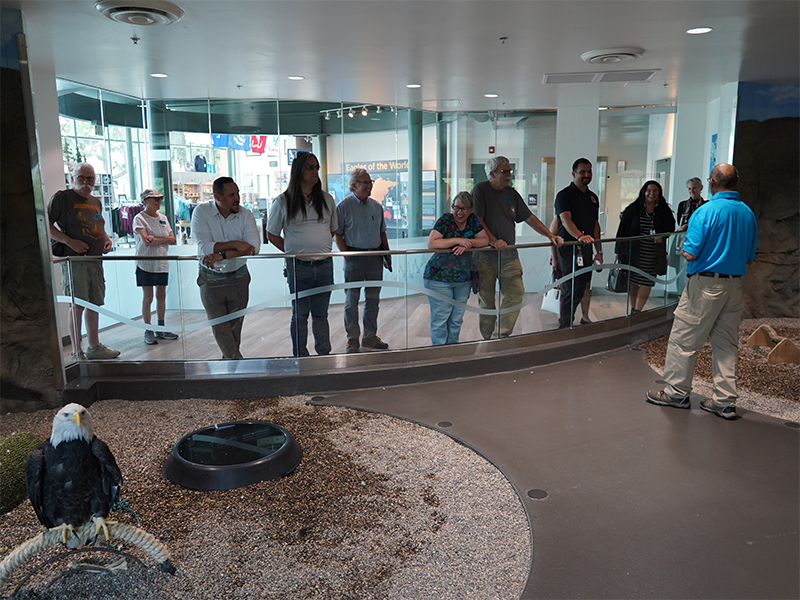
Guests visiting "Ambassador Avenue".

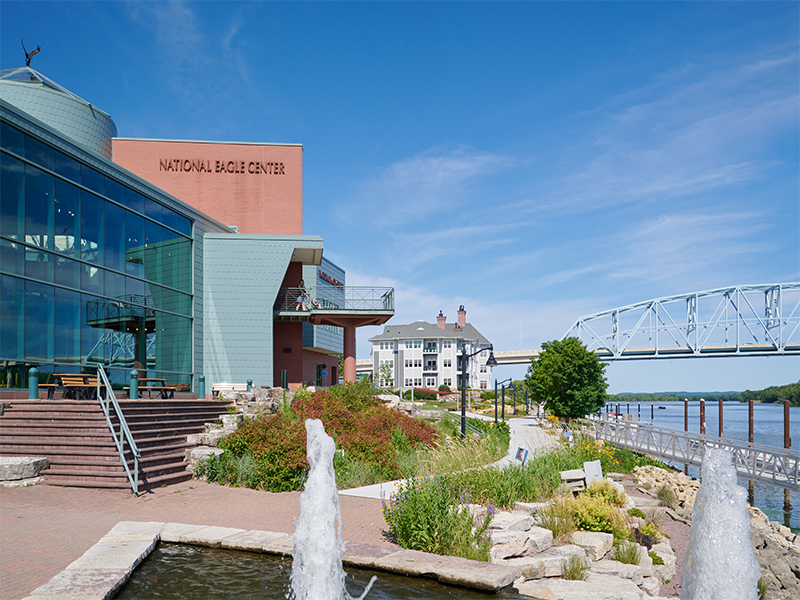
View of the riverfront plaza and walkway just outside of the National Eagle Center.

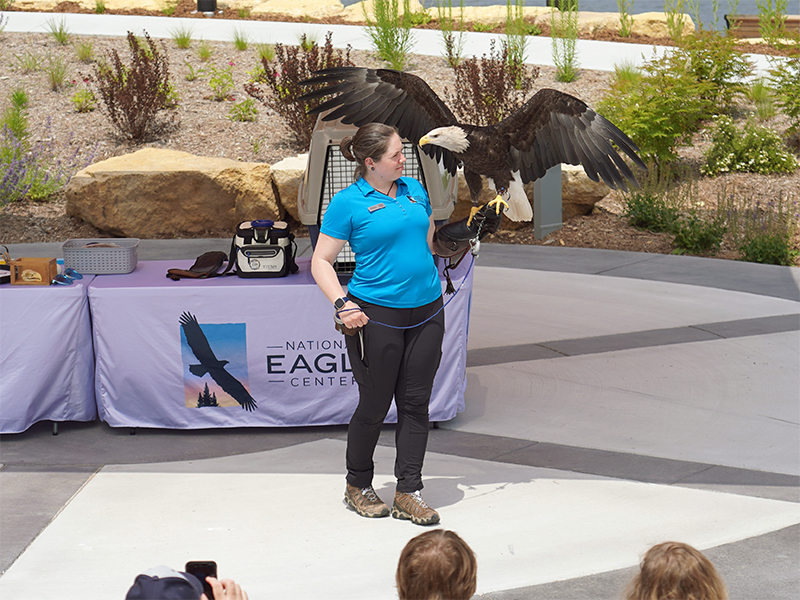
Ambassador Latsch during a program in the Riverfront Amphitheater.

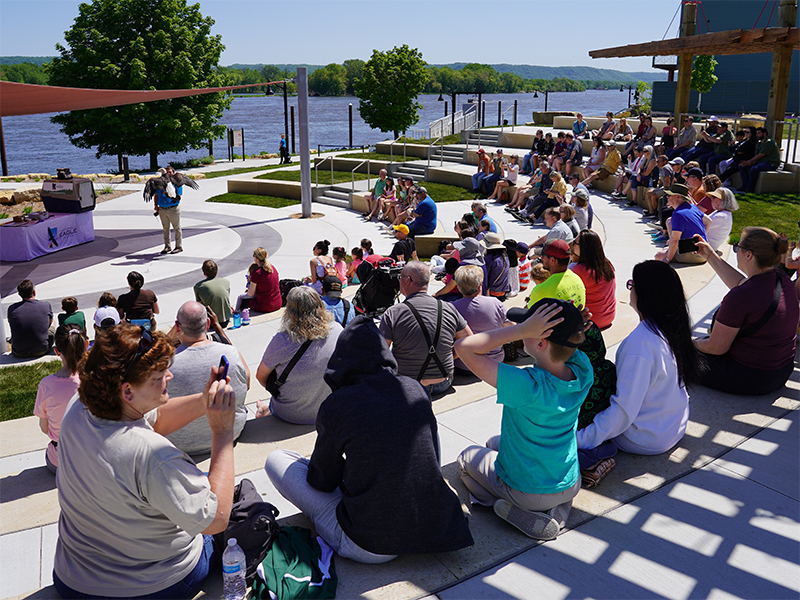
Summer crowd enjoying an outdoor Riverfront Amphitheater eagle program.

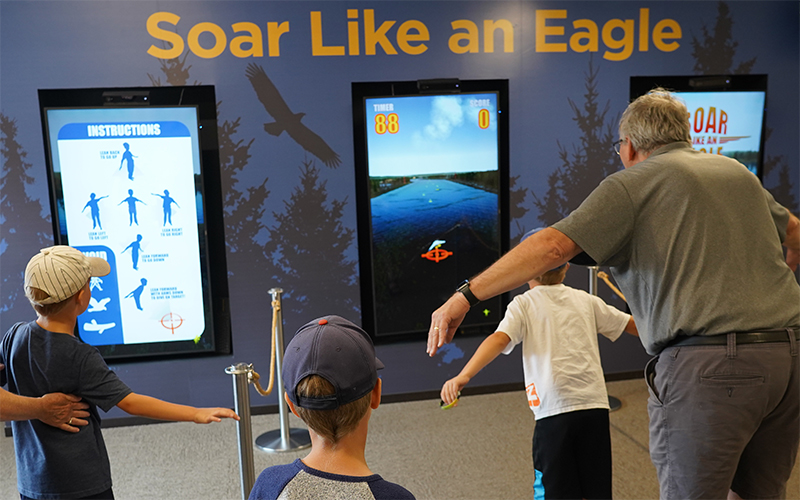
Guest play the SOAR Like An Eagle interactive game.

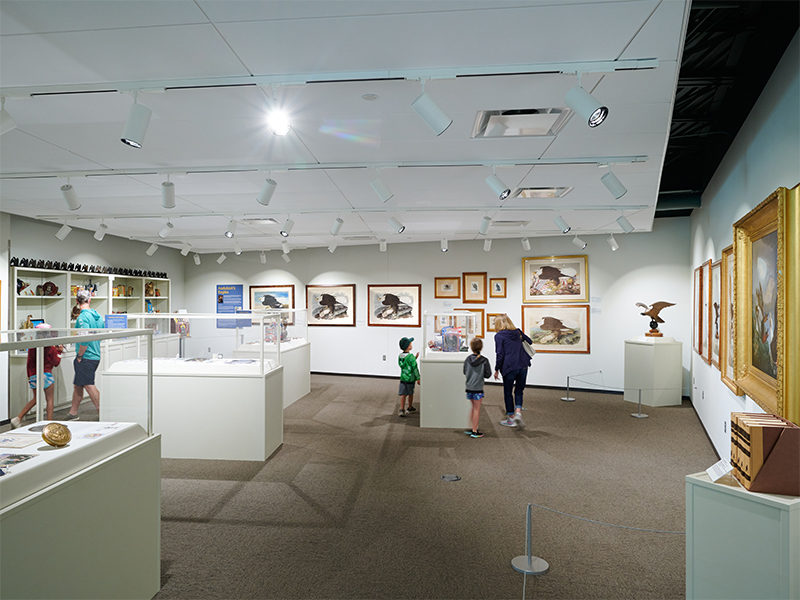
American Eagle Gallery, home to the world-class Preston Cook American Eagle Collection.

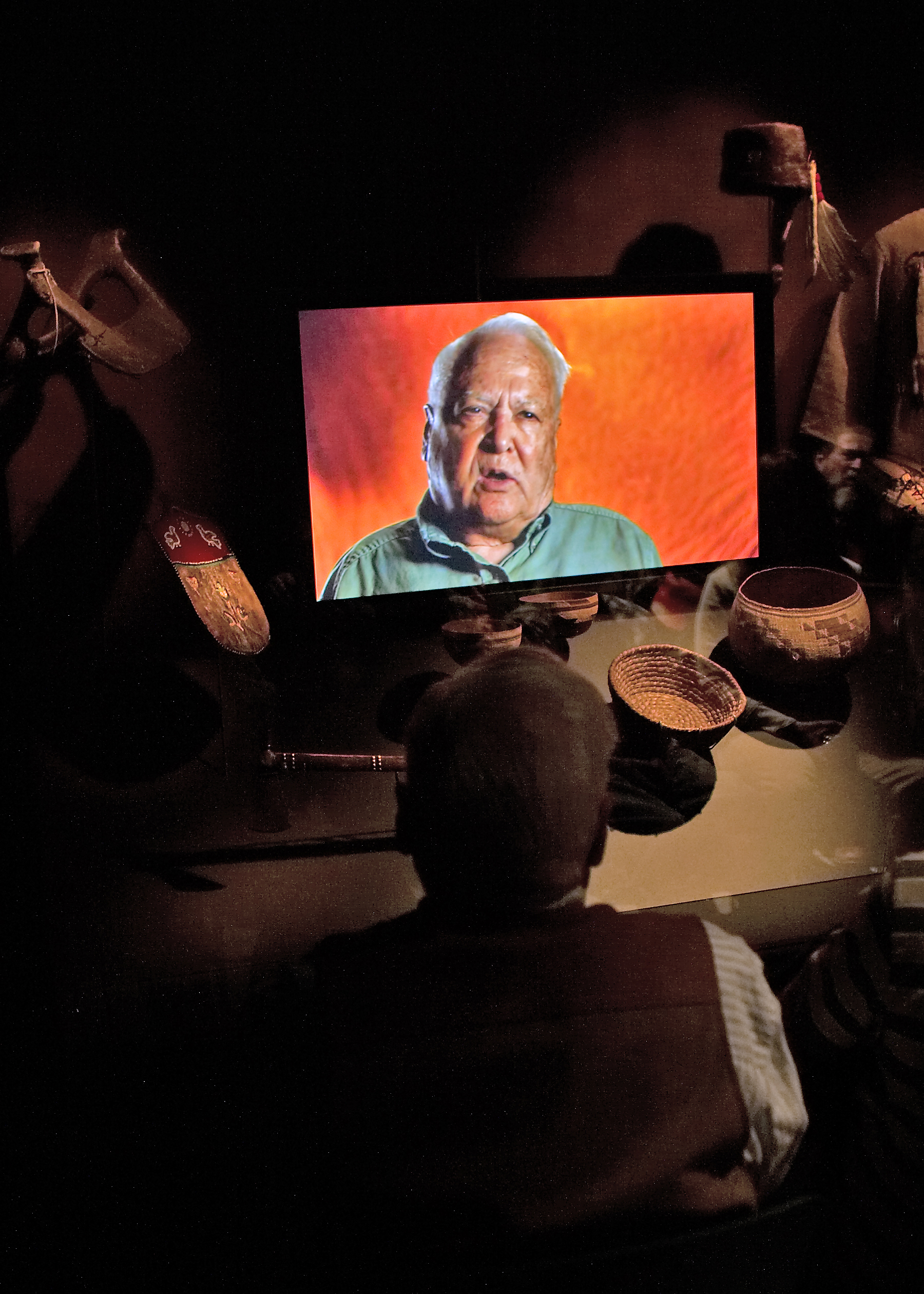
Jim Stokes watching a video of himself in the Dakota Family Theater.

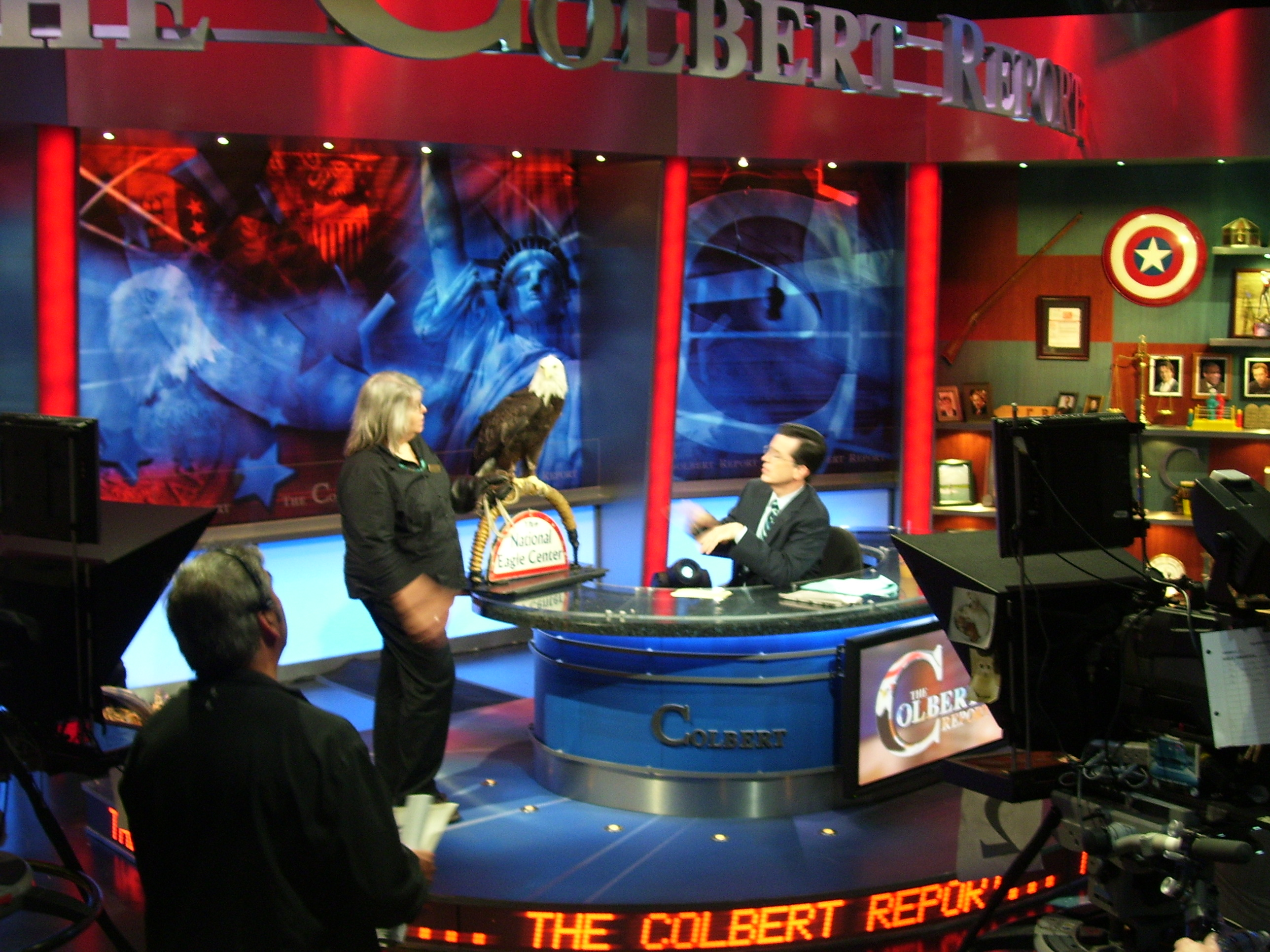
National Eagle Center on The Colbert Report with Stephen Colbert in 2007

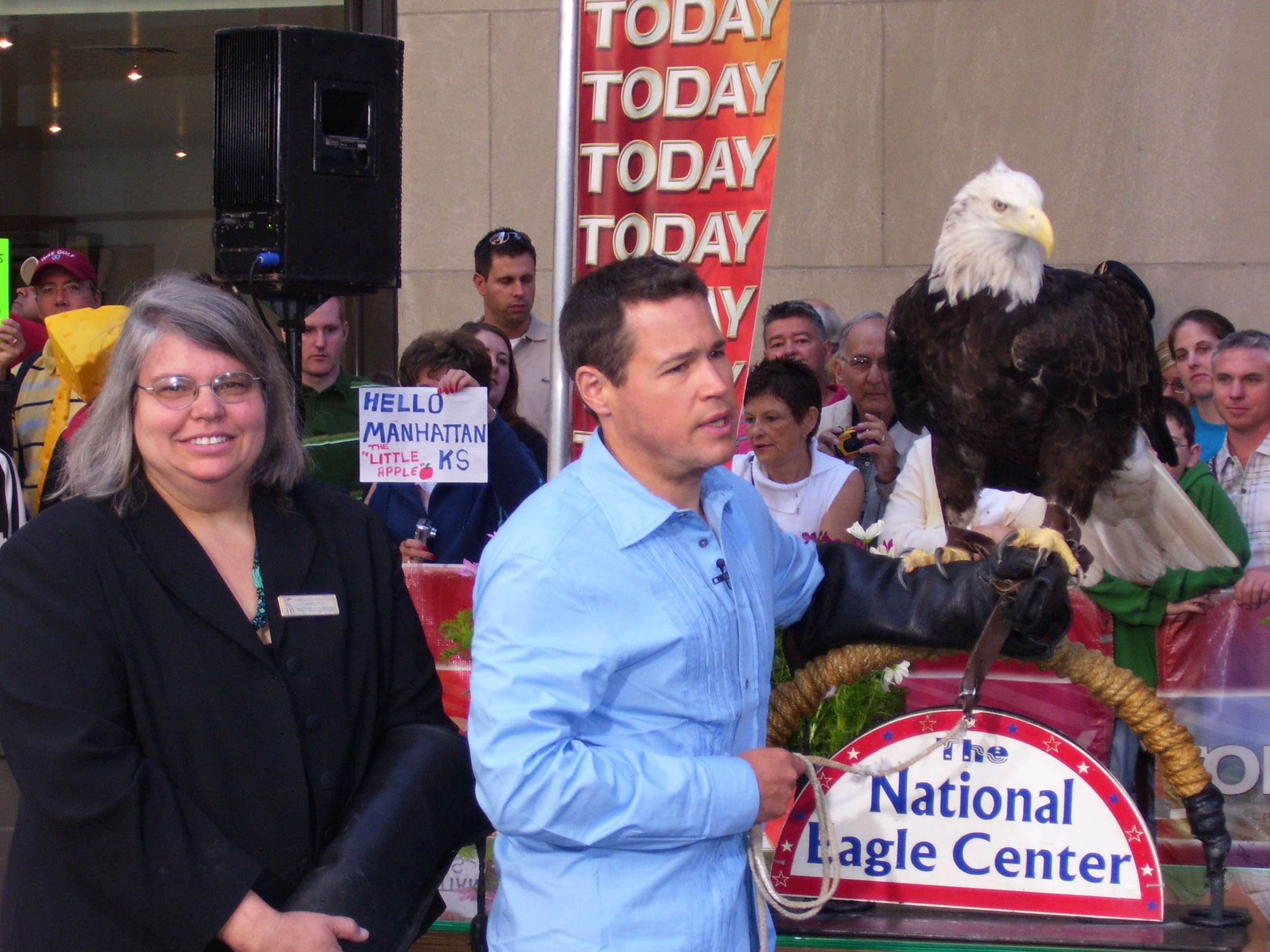
National Eagle Center on the Today Show.

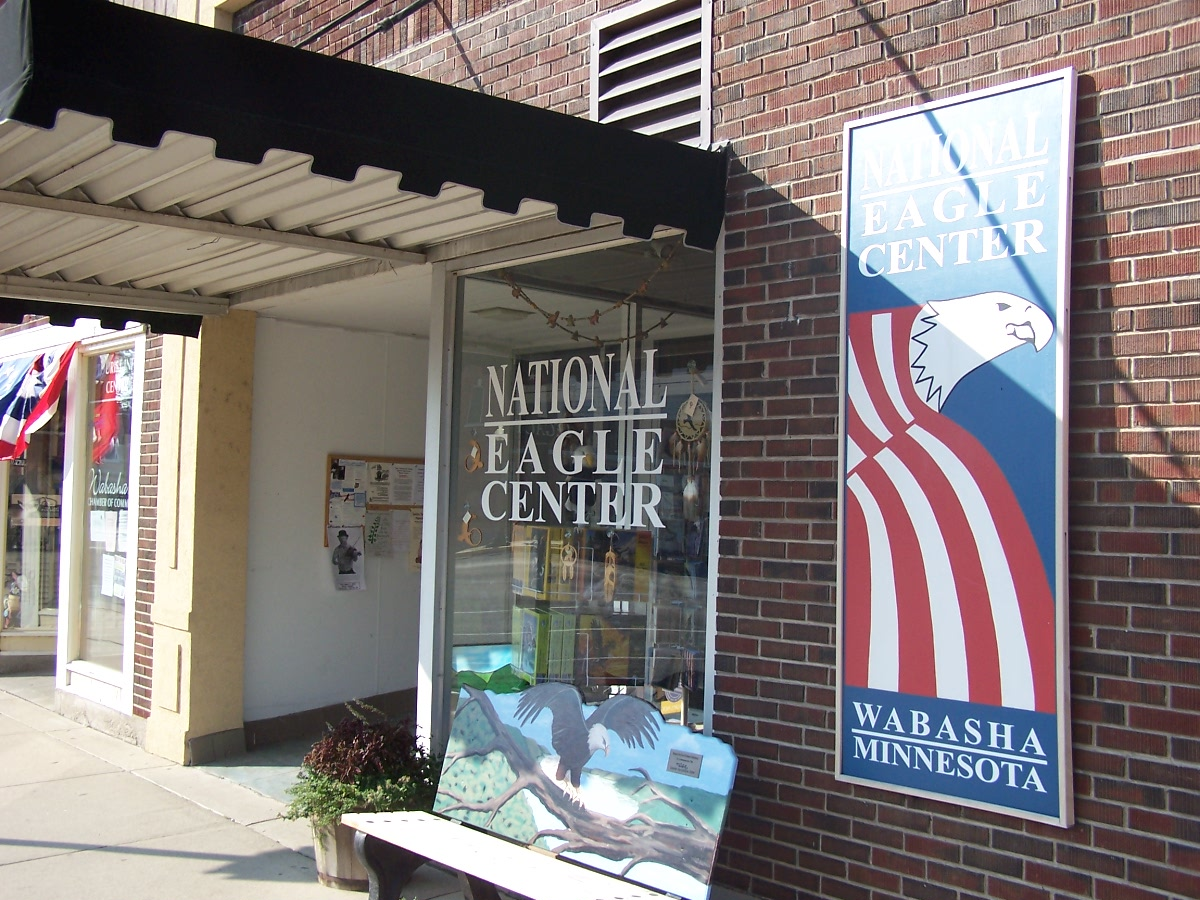
Entrance to the old Eagle Center Building on Main St.

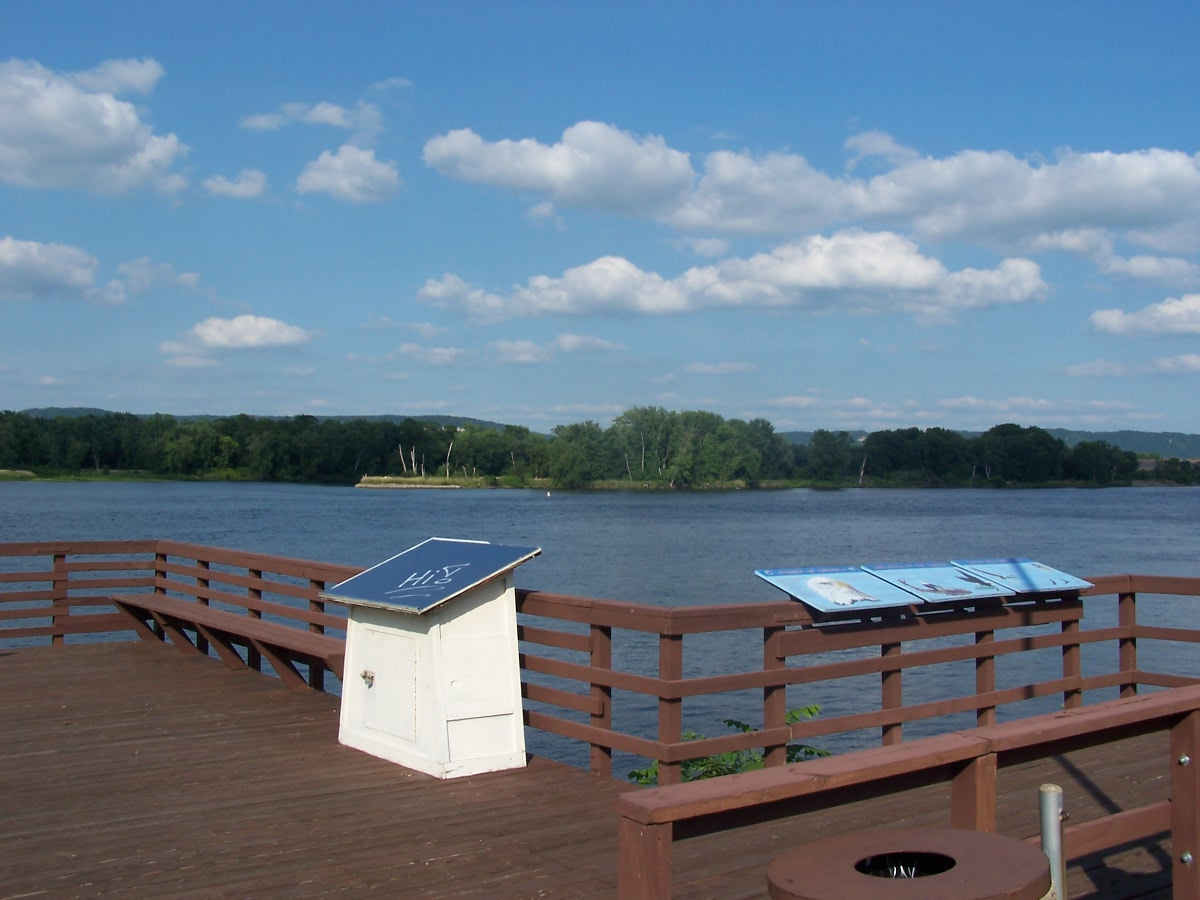
Original Eagle Observation Deck in 2006
