= Preston Cook =

Collector, Bald Eagle Advocate

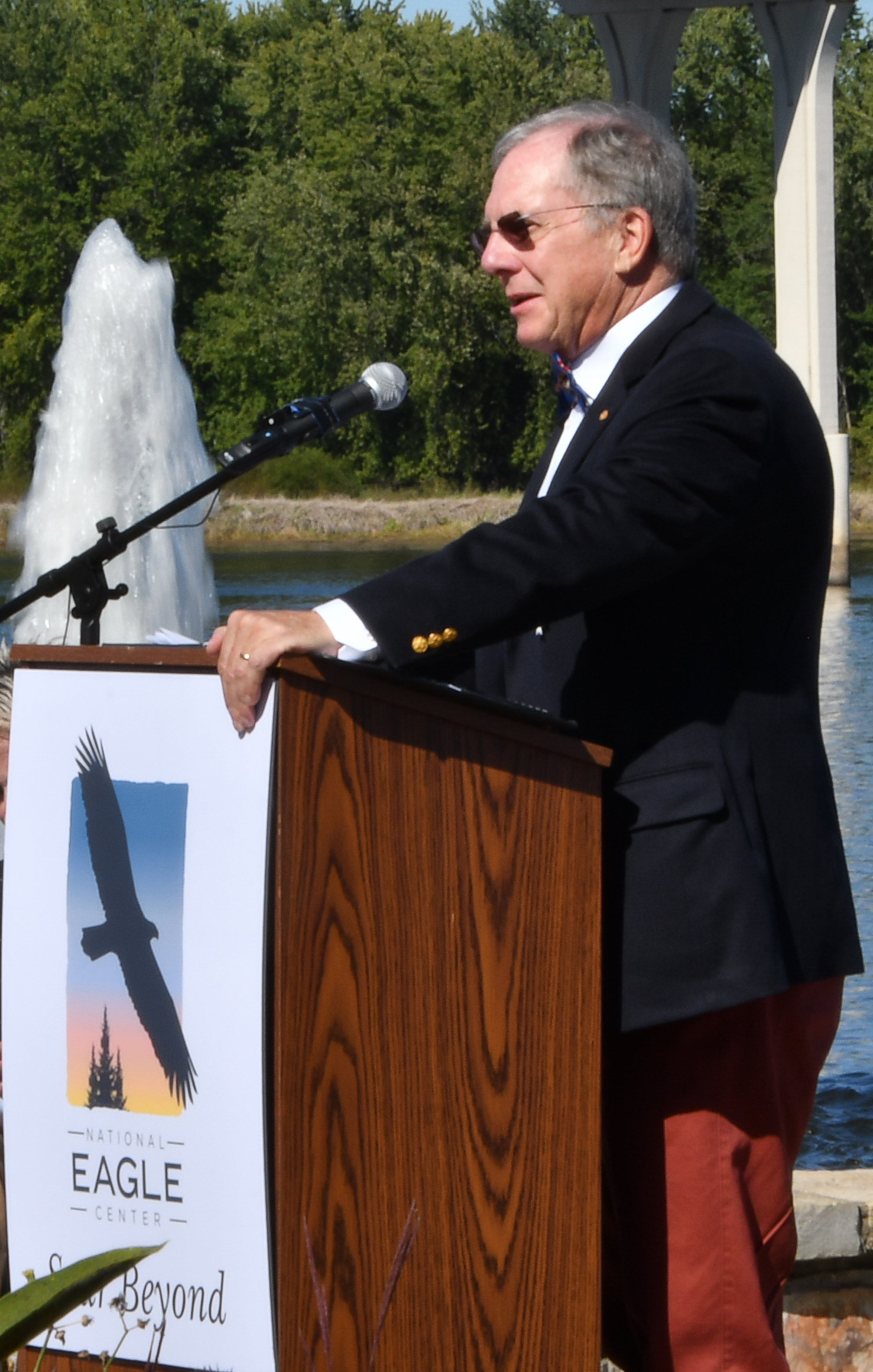
- Cook at the National Eagle Center in 2021
- Born: 1946 (age 79–80)
- Education: Kendall College; Lone Mountain College
- Occupation: real estate developer
- Organization: National Eagle Center
- Known for: National Bird Initiative; American Eagle Collection
- Spouse: Donna Cook (m. 1986 – present)

Preston Cook (born 1946) is an American collector and commercial real estate investor. He created the Preston Cook National Eagle Collection comprising more than 40,000 objects featuring eagle imagery. Cook is credited with helping designate the bald eagle as the official national bird of the United States through the National Bird Initiative. Cook has published three books on the eagle.

== Early life and education ==
Cook was raised in Evanston, Illinois, and graduated from high school in 1964. He attended Kendall College and Lone Mountain College in San Francisco.

== Career and collection ==
Cook worked for many years as a commercial real estate developer in the San Francisco Bay Area. He began collecting eagle-related objects in the 1968. His collection grew to more than 40,000 items, including everyday objects, historical artifacts, memorabilia, and fine art. The collection, formally titled the Preston Cook National Eagle Collection, was later donated to the National Eagle Center in Wabasha, Minnesota.

== National Bird Initiative ==
While researching his book American Eagle: A Visual History of Our National Emblem, Cook discovered that the bald eagle, despite its longstanding symbolic role, had never been officially designated as the national bird. In coordination with Jack E. Davis, author of The Bald Eagle: The Improbable Journey of America's Bird, and The National Eagle Center, Cook started the National Bird Initiative to create federal legislation on the matter. Cook drafted a bill to designate the bald eagle as the national bird. The bill was introduced by Amy Klobuchar and Cynthia Lummis in the U.S. Senate and Brad Finstad in the U.S. House of Representatives. It passed both houses of Congress and was signed into law by President Joe Biden in December 2024.

== Personal life ==
In 1986, Cook married Donna Cook who had five children from a previous marriage. He lives in Wabasha, Minnesota.

== Bibliography ==
- Cook, Preston (2019). American Eagle - A Visual History of Our National Emblem. Goff. ISBN 9781941806289.
- Cook, Preston; Davis, Jack E. (2024). Clearing the Air : Attack of the Giant Eagle. National Eagle Center. ISBN 9798218465698.
- Cook, Preston (2025). How the Bald Eagle Became Our National Bird. National Eagle Center. ISBN 9798218660376.
- Cook, Preston (2026). Symbolism & Celebrations. 250 Years of Freedom. National Eagle Center. ISBN 979-8-234-01479-5.
