= List of Superfund sites in Minnesota =

This is a list of Superfund sites in Minnesota designated under the Comprehensive Environmental Response, Compensation, and Liability Act (CERCLA) environmental law. The CERCLA federal law of 1980 authorized the United States Environmental Protection Agency (EPA) to create a list of polluted locations requiring a long-term response to clean up hazardous material contaminations. These locations are known as Superfund sites, and are placed on the National Priorities List (NPL).

The NPL guides the EPA in "determining which sites warrant further investigation" for environmental remediation. As of May 4, 2010, there were 25 Superfund sites on the National Priorities List in Minnesota. 21 others have been cleaned up and removed from the list; none are currently proposed for addition.

== Superfund sites ==
Deleted from National Priorities List

CERCLIS ID	Name	County	Reason	Proposed	Listed	Construction completed	Partially deleted	Deleted
MND980904023	Adrian Municipal Well Field	Nobles	Groundwater pollution by VOCs including benzene and toluene. Contaminated municipal drinking wells have been closed and underground storage tanks near the site have been removed.	10/15/1984	06/10/1986	07/20/1992	–	12/30/1992
MND980898068	Agate Lake Scrapyard	Cass	Groundwater contamination by VOCs including TCE, benzene, toluene and methylene chloride and soil contamination by PCBs, dioxins, furans, and lead.	10/15/1984	06/10/1986	03/31/1995	–	08/01/1997
MND980823975	Arrowhead Refinery Company	St. Louis	Highly acidic sludge, soil and sediment were contaminated by VOCs, PAHs, petroleum hydrocarbons and lead.	09/08/1983	09/21/1984	12/19/1996	–	–
MND982425209	Baytown Township Ground Water Plume	Washington	TCE contamination of a groundwater aquifer used for local drinking water supplies, from a metal-working facility and possibly from Lake Elmo Airport.	10/14/1992	12/16/1994	–	–	–
MND053417515	Boise Cascade/Onan Corp./Medtronic, Inc.	Anoka	Soil, sediment and groundwater contamination by creosote, phenols and other organic compounds, from former wood treatment operations. The groundwater is used for local drinking water supply.	09/08/1983	09/21/1984	09/30/1992	–	02/15/1995
MND000686196	Burlington Northern (Brainerd/Baxter)	Crow Wing	Soil and groundwater contamination and risk of surface water contamination by creosote, PAHs, oil and grease, salts and phenols from former wood treatment operations.	12/30/1982	09/08/1983	09/18/1995	–	–
MND981191570	Dakhue Sanitary Landfill	Dakota	Groundwater contamination by VOCs, chloroform and heavy metals, including cadmium and lead.	10/26/1989	08/30/1990	06/30/1994	–	07/24/1995
MND981088180	East Bethel Demolition Landfill	Anoka	Soil contamination by VOCs, including toluene and vinyl chloride. An aquifer, which provides drinking water to some local residents, was contaminated by VOCs, barium, cadmium, mercury and lead, though most residents use a deeper aquifer. Local wetland and surface water may have been at risk from contamination.	09/18/1985	06/10/1986	06/30/2000	–	05/07/1996
MND006481543	FMC Corporation (Fridley Plant)	Anoka	Soil was contaminated by TCE. Groundwater is contaminated by VOCs including TCE, which probably contributed to the detection of VOCs in the Minneapolis drinking water supply.	12/30/1982	09/08/1983	09/08/1992	–	–
MND038384004	Freeway Sanitary Landfill	Dakota	Groundwater contamination by VOCs (including benzene, ethyl benzene and xylene) and heavy metals (including arsenic, chromium, copper, lead and manganese). Risk of transfer of contaminants to Burnsville municipal water supply and the Minnesota River.	09/18/1985	06/10/1986	–	–	–
MND985701309	Fridley Commons Park Well Field	Anoka	VOCs, including TCE have been discovered in some municipal wells, but at levels below Federal drinking water limits. The situation is being monitored but no remedial action is currently felt necessary.	09/29/1998	01/19/1999	10/25/2005	–	–
MND051441731	General Mills/Henkel Corporation	Hennepin	The site is a former research laboratory. Groundwater is contaminated by VOCs, including TCE, benzene, chloroform, toluene and xylenes and soil was contaminated by VOCs from solvent disposal.	09/08/1983	09/21/1984	06/05/1992	–	–
MND044799856	Joslyn Manufacturing & Supply Company	Hennepin	Soil and groundwater contamination by PCP, PAHs, phenol and heavy metals from former wood treatment operations.	09/08/1983	09/21/1984	12/21/1995	04/22/2002	–
MND000686071	Koch Refining Company/N-Ren Corporation	Dakota	The site is an active oil refinery. Groundwater is contaminated by VOCs, PAHs phenols and lead; soil is contaminated by PAHs and VOCs including benzene, toluene and xylenes.	10/15/1984	06/10/1986	07/16/2008	–	06/15/1995
MND000819359	Koppers Coke	Ramsey	Soil and groundwater contamination by VOCs, semi-VOCs, PAHs, metals and cyanides from a former coking plant.	12/30/1982	09/08/1983	07/20/1998	–	–
MND980904049	Kummer Sanitary Landfill	Beltrami	The site is a closed landfill with a history of operational violations. Site groundwater contains by VOCs, including vinyl chloride, xylenes, carbon tetrachloride and naphthalene and is at risk of contaminating nearby Lake Bemidji and wetlands.	10/15/1984	06/10/1986	06/22/2000	–	04/26/1996
MND059680165	Kurt Manufacturing Company	Anoka	The site is an active electronic component manufacturing facility. Shallow groundwater and soil are contaminated by PCE, TCA, TCE and DCE.	10/15/1984	06/10/1986	09/20/1995	–	–
MND981090483	LaGrand Sanitary Landfill	Douglas	Groundwater contamination by volatile hydrocarbons.	06/10/1986	07/22/1987	08/07/1995	–	10/23/1997
MND980792469	Lehillier/Mankato Site	Blue Earth	Groundwater contamination by VOCs, including TCE from uncontrolled dumping. Domestic wells were contaminated and a municipal well was close to the plume, though no contamination was detected there.	12/30/1982	09/08/1983	04/08/1992	–	–
MND980904072	Long Prairie Ground Water Contamination	Todd	A former dry cleaning operation contaminated soil and groundwater with PCE, TCE, DCE and vinyl chloride. Private drinking water wells were contaminated and municipal wells were closed from 1983 to 1985.	10/15/1984	06/10/1986	09/19/1997	–	–
MND006192694	MacGillis & Gibbs/Bell Lumber & Pole Company	Ramsey	Groundwater, sediments, and soil are contaminated with PAHs, PCP and heavy metals such as copper, chromium and arsenic from wood treatment operations. Municipal wells are unaffected but private wells have been contaminated and there is a risk of contamination to local wetlands.	09/08/1983	09/21/1984	09/25/2002	–	–
MND980792287	Morris Arsenic Dump	Stevens	Stevens County reportedly buried around 1,500 lb (680 kg) of surplus arsenic-containing pesticide in a disused gravel pit in the 1940s. Arsenic was present in soil, groundwater and private drinking water well samples but at levels within the naturally occurring range in Minnesota, which do not pose a health hazard. No cleanup action was taken.	09/08/1983	09/21/1984	08/07/1985	–	03/07/1986
MN3170022914	Naval Industrial Reserve Ordnance Plant	Anoka	Groundwater and soil are contaminated by solvents, including TCE and methylene dichloride and PAHs were found in surface soil. Groundwater flows into the Mississippi River, upstream of the Minneapolis drinking water treatment plant uptake.	07/14/1989	11/21/1989	09/23/2003	–	–
MN7213820908	New Brighton/Arden Hills/Twin Cities Army Ammunition Plant (US Army)	Ramsey	Groundwater, soil, sediments, and surface water contaminated with volatile organic compounds (VOCs), semi-VOCs, metals, PCBs, cyanide, pesticides, and explosives.	12/30/1982	09/08/1983	–	–	–
MND097891634	NL Industries/Taracorp/Golden Auto	Hennepin	Soil was contaminated by lead from former smelting operations.	12/30/1982	09/08/1983	09/27/1995	–	05/21/1998
MND006154017	Nutting Truck & Caster Company	Rice	Groundwater contamination by TCE and DCE. Municipal wells were also contaminated by TCE but there is no definitive link to the site.	09/08/1983	09/21/1984	09/24/1992	–	–
MND980609515	Oakdale Dump	Washington	Hazardous waste, including VOCs such as isopropyl ether and benzene were disposed of at three sites; one has low-level heavy metal contamination. Residential drinking water wells were contaminated.	12/30/1982	09/08/1983	09/07/1995	–	–
MND980904056	Oak Grove Sanitary Landfill	Anoka	Groundwater, leachate and sediments contaminated by VOCs, phenols and heavy metals. Groundwater also contaminated by phthalates.	10/15/1984	06/10/1986	08/18/1993	–	10/17/1996
MND000874354	Olmsted County Sanitary Landfill	Olmsted	The first cell of the landfill was unlined and the second poorly lined, resulting in groundwater contamination by VOCs and heavy metals, including chromium, cadmium and lead and extensive leachate seeps. Waste has been capped and a leachate collection system installed.	10/15/1984	06/10/1986	06/21/1994	–	02/15/1995
MND980609572	Perham Arsenic Site	Otter Tail	Groundwater and soil are contaminated by arsenic pesticide dumped in a shallow pit in 1947. The site was redeveloped for commercial use and eleven people were poisoned by a well installed in 1972. The well and dump have been capped and groundwater treatment is ongoing.	09/08/1983	09/21/1984	–	09/29/1998	–
MND000245795	Pine Bend Sanitary Landfill	Dakota	Groundwater VOC contamination from leachate.	10/15/1984	06/10/1986	09/28/1995	–	06/23/1998
MND980609804	Reilly Tar & Chem (St. Louis Park Plant)	Hennepin	Soil and groundwater are contaminated by PAHs from former coal tar distillation and wood treatment operations. Contaminated groundwater aquifer is used by around 43,000 people and seven municipal wells have been closed.	12/30/1982	09/08/1983	06/30/1997	–	–
MND980904064	Ritari Post & Pole	Wadena	Soil and groundwater contamination by PCP and dioxins and groundwater contamination by phenols from former wood treatment operations.	01/22/1987	07/22/1987	09/26/2001	–	–
MND981002256	St. Augusta Sanitary Landfill/Engen Dump	Stearns	Groundwater is contaminated by heavy metals, including arsenic, barium and lead, VOCs, atrazine and phthalates.	09/18/1985	07/22/1987	09/26/2000	–	11/14/1996
MND039045430	St. Louis River Site	St. Louis	Past industrial and disposal practices have contaminated river sediments with tar, PAHs, VOCs, cyanide, naphthalene and heavy metals including mercury. Operations at the US Steel Duluth Works site caused soil, sediment, shallow groundwater and surface water contamination by semi-VOCs, PAHs and metals.	09/08/1983	09/21/1984	–	–	–
MND057597940	St. Regis Paper Company	Cass	Groundwater, soil and sediment contamination by PAHs, metals, PCP, dioxins and furans from former wood treatment operations.	09/08/1983	09/21/1984	–	–	–
MND980609614	South Andover Site	Anoka	Waste disposal and salvage operations contaminated soil and groundwater with vinyl chloride and other VOCs. The 2021 FYR concluded that the remedy is currently functioning as intended and continues to be protective of human health and environment in the short term. However, in February of 2022, the Minnesota Pollution Control Agency (MPCA) notified EPA of private wells north of the South Andover site impacted with 1,4-dioxane and per- and polyfluoroalkyl substances (PFAS).					
MNN000509136	South Minneapolis Residential Soil Contamination	Hennepin	Arsenic contamination of soil over 1,480 acres (6.0 km^{2}), including 3,500 residential properties, along with other properties. Contamination is thought to have come from a former pesticide manufacturing plant.	09/27/2006	09/19/2007	09/27/2011	–	–
MN8570024275	Twin Cities Air Force Reserve Base (Small Arms Range Landfill)	Hennepin	Arsenic, beryllium, cadmium, lead, nickel, selenium and vanadium contamination of groundwater.	01/22/1987	07/22/1987	09/24/1992	–	12/16/1996
MND022949192	Union Scrap Iron & Metal Company	Hennepin	Battery recycling at two sites resulted in sludges and soil contaminated by PCBs and heavy metals including lead, arsenic, cadmium, nickel and copper. Airborne lead levels were high and there was potential for groundwater and surface water contamination. No significant contamination remains after removal actions.	09/08/1983	09/21/1984	09/18/1990	–	09/10/1991
MND980613780	University of Minnesota (Rosemount Research Center)	Dakota	Soil contamination by lead, copper and PCBs from tenants and VOCs, primarily chloroform, from university laboratory waste disposal.	10/15/1984	06/10/1986	06/29/1994	–	02/06/2001
MND981002249	Waite Park Wells	Stearns	Municipal wells are contaminated by TCE and PCE from two industrial sites. There is a light non-aqueous phase liquid layer of petroleum products above the water table, elevated levels of PCBs, lead and other heavy metals in the soil, and PCBs and VOCs in the groundwater.	09/18/1985	06/10/1986	09/21/1999	–	–
MND980704738	Washington County Landfill	Washington	VOC contamination of soil and groundwater, including private wells. Potentially explosive methane concentrations.	09/08/1983	09/21/1984	09/30/1992	–	05/16/1996
MND980609119	Waste Disposal Engineering	Anoka	Groundwater, soil gas and surface water contamination by VOCs.	12/30/1982	09/08/1983	09/27/1995	–	06/05/1996
MND006252233	Whittaker Corporation	Hennepin	Groundwater and soil contamination by heavy metals, including cadmium and lead and VOCs.	09/08/1983	09/21/1984	04/07/1992	–	02/11/1999
MND980034516	Windom Dump	Cottonwood	Groundwater contamination by VOCs and heavy metals including arsenic, cadmium and chromium. Soil contamination by VOCs. There was a risk of contamination of private and municipal drinking wells.	10/15/1984	06/10/1986	12/24/1991	–	10/06/2000

== See also ==
- List of Superfund sites in the United States
- List of environmental issues
- List of waste types
- TOXMAP
