= Belisle =

Belisle or Bélisle is a surname, derived from an island off the coast of France called “Belle Ile” (Beautiful Isle). Notable people with the name include:

- Danny Belisle (1937–2022), Canadian ice hockey player and coach
- Eugene Belisle (1910–1983), American Olympic rower
- Ève Bélisle (born 1979), Canadian curler and amateur ornithologist
- Jerome J. Belisle (1932–2022), American businessman and politician
- Khalid Belisle (born 1981), Belizean politician and mayor of Belmopan
- Kirk Belisle (died 2003), Belizean stabbing victim
- Lyndsay Belisle (born 1977), Canadian freestyle wrestler
- Matt Belisle (born 1980), American baseball pitcher
- Mitch Belisle (born 1985), American lacrosse player
- Polin Belisle (born 1966), Olympic marathon runner for Belize and Honduras
- Rhéal Bélisle (1919–1992), Canadian politician from Ontario
- Richard Bélisle (born 1946), Canadian politician from Quebec
- Roger Belisle (born 1947), Canadian ice hockey player
