= Road Repair and Accountability Act =

2017 California infrastructure funding bill and fuel tax

California State Legislature
- Full name: Road Repair and Accountability Act of 2017 Official Name: An act to amend Section 14526.5 of, to add Sections 14033, 14110, 14526.7, 14556.41, and 16321 to, to add Chapter 5 (commencing with Section 14460) to Part 5 of Division 3 of Title 2 of, to repeal Sections 63048.66, 63048.67, 63048.7, 63048.75, 63048.8, and 63048.85 of, and to repeal and add Section 63048.65 of, the Government Code, to add Section 43021 to the Health and Safety Code, to amend Section 99312.1 of, and to add Sections 99312.3, 99312.4, and 99314.9 to, the Public Utilities Code, to amend Sections 6051.8, 6201.8, 7360, 8352.4, 8352.5, 8352.6, and 60050 of, to add Sections 7361.2, 7653.2, 60050.2, and 60201.4 to, and to add Chapter 6 (commencing with Section 11050) to Part 5 of Division 2 of, the Revenue and Taxation Code, to amend Sections 2104, 2105, 2106, and 2107 of, to add Sections 2103.1 and 2192.4 to, to add Article 2.5 (commencing with Section 800) to Chapter 4 of Division 1 of, and to add Chapter 2 (commencing with Section 2030) and Chapter 8.5 (commencing with Section 2390) to Division 3 of, the Streets and Highways Code, and to amend Section 4156 of, and to add Sections 4000.15 and 9250.6 to, the Vehicle Code, relating to transportation, making an appropriation therefor, and declaring the urgency thereof, to take effect immediately.
- Introduced: December 6, 2016
- Assembly voted: 54-26
- Senate voted: 27-11
- Signed into law: Yes
- Governor: Jerry Brown
- Code: Government, Health and Safety, Public Utilities, Revenue and Taxation, Streets and Highways, and Vehicle
- Section: Government Code: To amend Section 14526.5 of, to add Sections 14033, 14110, 14526.7, 14556.41, and 16321, to repeal Sections 63048.66, 63048.67, 63048.7, 63048.75, 63048.8, and 63048.85, to repeal and add Section 63048.65 of, and to add Chapter 5 (commencing with Section 14460) to Part 5 of Division 3 of Title 2; Health and Safety Code: To add Section 43021; Public Utilities Code: To amend Section 99312.1 and to add Sections 99312.3, 99312.4, and 99314.9; Revenue and Taxation Code: To amend Sections 6051.8, 6201.8, 7360, 8352.4, 8352.5, 8352.6, and 60050, to add Sections 7361.2, 7653.2, 60050.2, and 60201.4, and to add Chapter 6 (commencing with Section 11050) to Part 5 of Division 2; Streets and Highways Code: To amend Sections 2104, 2105, 2106, and 2107, to add Sections 2103.1 and 2192.4, to add Article 2.5 (commencing with Section 800) to Chapter 4 of Division 1 and to add [http://leginfo.legislature.ca.gov/faces/codes_displayText.xhtml?lawCode=SHC&division=3.&title=&part=&chapter=2.&article= Chapter 2 (commencing with Section 2030) and Chapter 8.5 (commencing with Section 2390) to Division 3; Vehicle Code: To amend Section 4156 of, and to add Sections 4000.15 and 9250.6
- Website: https://rebuildingca.ca.gov

Status: Amended

The Road Repair and Accountability Act of 2017 (Senate Bill 1), also known as the "Gas Tax", is a legislative bill in the U.S. state of California that was passed on April 6, 2017 with the aim of repairing roads, improving traffic safety, and expanding public transit systems across the state. The approval of the fuel tax was for a projected $52.4 billion, or $5.24 billion per year, to be raised over the next 10 years to fund the state's infrastructure. The bill passed primarily along party lines, with most Democrats supporting the bill while most Republicans were against it. The bill passed with a vote of 27–11 in the Senate and 54–26 in the Assembly. According to California Department of Transportation, for maintenance projects on state highways, while providing funding to enhance trade corridors, transit, and active transportation facilities, in addition to repairing local streets and roads throughout California.

2020 model year and newer zero-emission vehicles will each be assessed an additional $100 "road improvement fee" with the passage of SB 1, as the fuel tax would not be applicable to them. In addition to the funding provisions, the bill requires diesel trucks and buses over 14,000 pounds which were made before 2010 to be banned from operating in California by January 1, 2023.

== Voting ==
The California State Senate had passed the bill 27–11 and 54–26 in the State Assembly, the minimum amount required to pass the legislation in both houses. Senator Steve Glazer (D–Orinda) stated that he would not back the bill "for good reasons" citing that he did not have enough support at home to vote in favor of the bill. Only one Democratic Assemblyman, Rudy Salas (D–Bakersfield) would not back the bill.

== Coverage ==
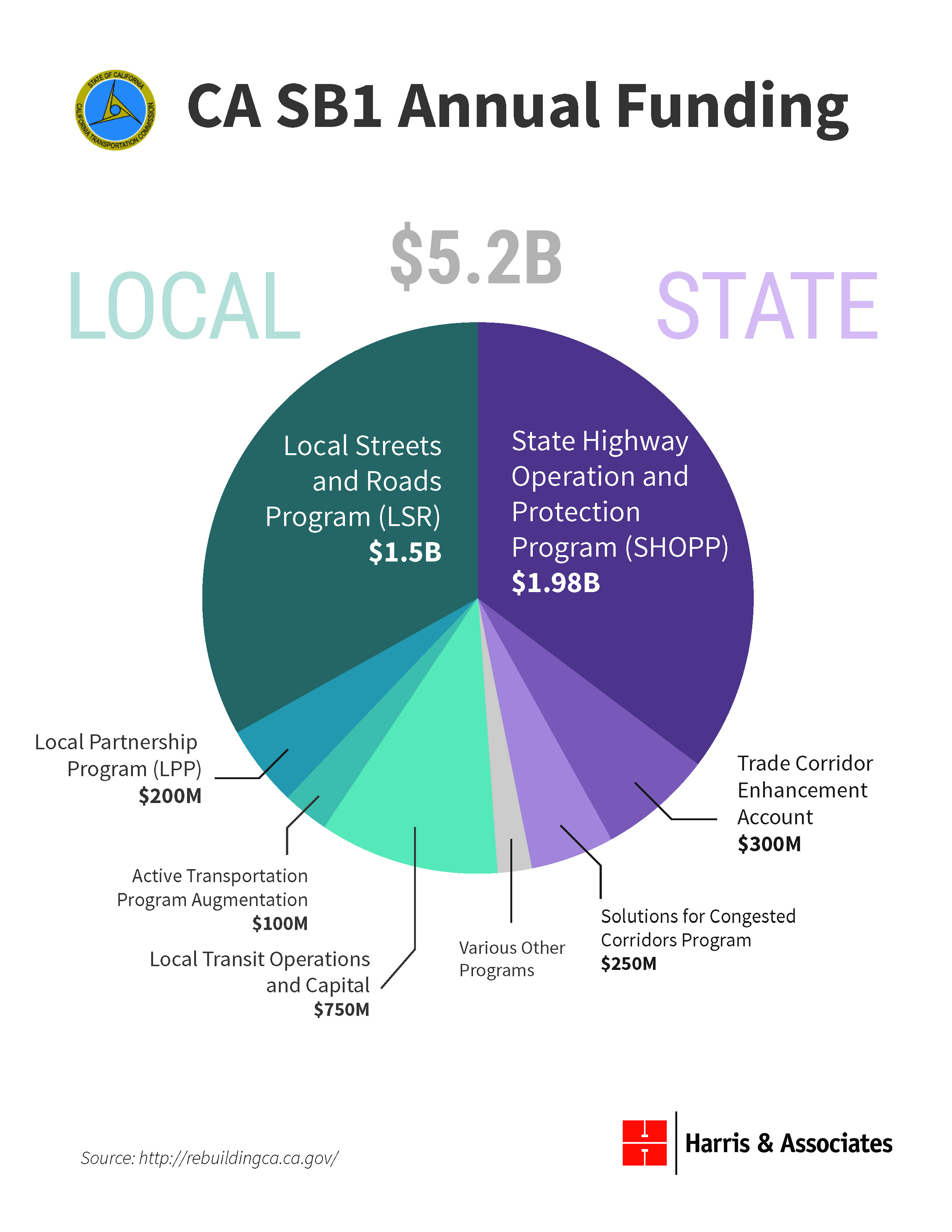
Breakdown of funding allocations between state and local.

The $52 billion does not go to one agency, but is divided up to go to different projects. The revenues estimated to be available for allocation under the act to local agencies are estimated to be the following amounts, over the 10 years after the bill was passed:

- $15 billion to local street and road maintenance.
- $7.5 billion for transit operations and capital.
- $2 billion for the local partnership program.
- $1 billion for the Active Transportation Program.
- $825 million for the regional share of the State Transportation Improvement Program.
- $250 million for local planning grants.

The revenues estimated to be available for allocation under the act to the state are estimated to be the following amounts, over the 10 years after the bill was passed:

- $15 billion for state highway maintenance and rehabilitation.
- $4 billion for highway bridge and culvert maintenance and rehabilitation.
- $3 billion for high priority freight corridors.
- $2.5 billion for congested corridor relief.
- $800 million for parks programs, off-highway vehicle programs, boating programs, and agricultural programs.
- $275 million for the inter-regional share of the State Transportation Improvement Program.
- $250 million for freeway service patrols.
- $70 million for transportation research at the University of California and the California State University.

The revenues are divided up between the state and local governments, with the vast majority ($30 billion) going towards road maintenance.

== Support ==
The American Road and Transportation Builders Association argued that the Road Repair and Accountability Act would provide California with $18.3 billion of economic benefits per year, including $3.8 billion per year in user benefits as a result of decreased congestion and improved infrastructure, and $11.2 billion in increased economic activity that would be enabled by better transportation infrastructure. Through the improved roads and transportation options, they said SB1 would save the average California household $300 per year.

== Criticisms ==
Some California residents complained about how the tax affects them, and Republicans said that California has one of the highest transportation tax rates in the country. A poll published in June 2017 showed that 58% of California residents oppose the increase in fuel taxes, 39% of all respondents stating they "strongly oppose" the increase.

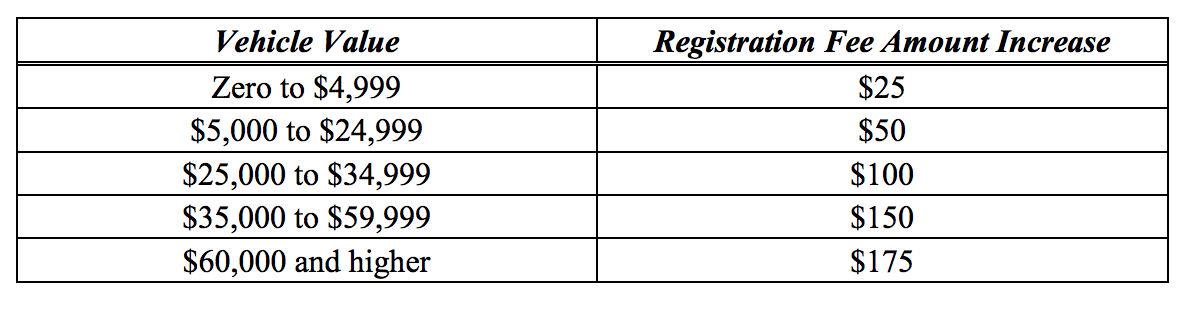
California SB1 Car Registration Fee annual increase.

SB1 also imposed a vehicle registration fee increase. The annual fee increase is based on the value of the vehicle, ranging from $25 to $175.

There are also voter concerns of transportation funds being protected to be used just for transportation, as by previous mandates of Proposition 42 (2003) and Proposition 1a (2006). Even with past protections, $1.8 billion of fuel tax funds in 2010 were moved to the General Fund, known as the gas tax swap. The June 2018 ballot included Proposition 69, an amendment that ensures revenues are used for transportation-related purposes.

California spends 2.5 times as much per mile of state-controlled highway as the national average. As such, one criticism centers not on the amount of revenue, but on the way the revenue is spent.

== Proposition 69 ==
The SB1 taxes were exempt from expenditures appropriations limits. Proposition 69 was a state constitution amendment that ensures that revenues from SB1 can only be used for transportation-related purposes. Voters approved this proposition in June 2018, locking the tax revenue to transportation only. The SB1 car registration fee increase and all older existing fuel tax revenues before SB1 are still appropriated to the General Fund.

== Proposition 6 ==
A ballot initiative “Repeal the Gas Car Tax” signature drive was led by Carl DeMaio. Volunteers gathered more than 940,000 signatures statewide, which exceeded the minimum requirement of 584,000 signatures for the measure to be on the November 2018 voter ballot. The Proposition 6 ballot initiative, if it had been passed by voters, would have repealed the fuel tax increase and the vehicle registration fee increase, and would have mandated any future fuel tax increase be approved only by popular vote. The measure failed with about 55% of voters opposed.
