= William M. Brown (businessman) =

American businessman

William M. "Bill" Brown is an American business executive. He became the CEO of 3M on May 1, 2024 and chairman of its board of directors on March 1, 2025. Mr. Brown is also the former chairman of L3Harris Technologies, a large defense contracting company. Previously, he was the president, CEO and chairman of Harris Corporation, the company that merged with L3 Technologies to create L3Harris Technologies in 2019.

Mr. Brown's tenure at L3Harris was controversial within the company, and he developed a deeply unfavorable reputation as someone who achieved stock price gains at the expense of his employees.

== Education ==
Brown earned a bachelor's degree in 1984, and a master's in 1987, both in mechanical engineering from Villanova University. He received an MBA from the Wharton Business School.

== Career ==
Prior to joining Harris Corporation in 2011, he was senior vice president leading strategy and development for United Technologies Corporation. Before this, he was president of UTC's Fire & Security business. During his 14 years at UTC he acquired executive managerial experience in the US and in other countries. Before UTC he worked for McKinsey & Company as a senior engagement manager, overseeing business relationships.

== Memberships and boards ==
Effective March 1, 2025, Brown was appointed Chairman of the Board of Directors at 3M, in addition to his roles as Chief Executive Officer and Director. This followed the retirement of Michael F. Roman as Executive Chairman.

Additionally, Brown is on the board of directors for the Celanese Corporation, the board of the Fire Department of New York City Foundation, the council of trustees for the Association of the United States Army and the board of trustees of the Florida Institute of Technology. He is chairman of the Aerospace Industries Association executive committee and a member of the National Security Telecommunications Advisory Committee. He was a member of the American Manufacturing Council before it was dissolved by President Trump.
