= Elastoplast =

Brand of adhesive bandages

Elastoplast logo

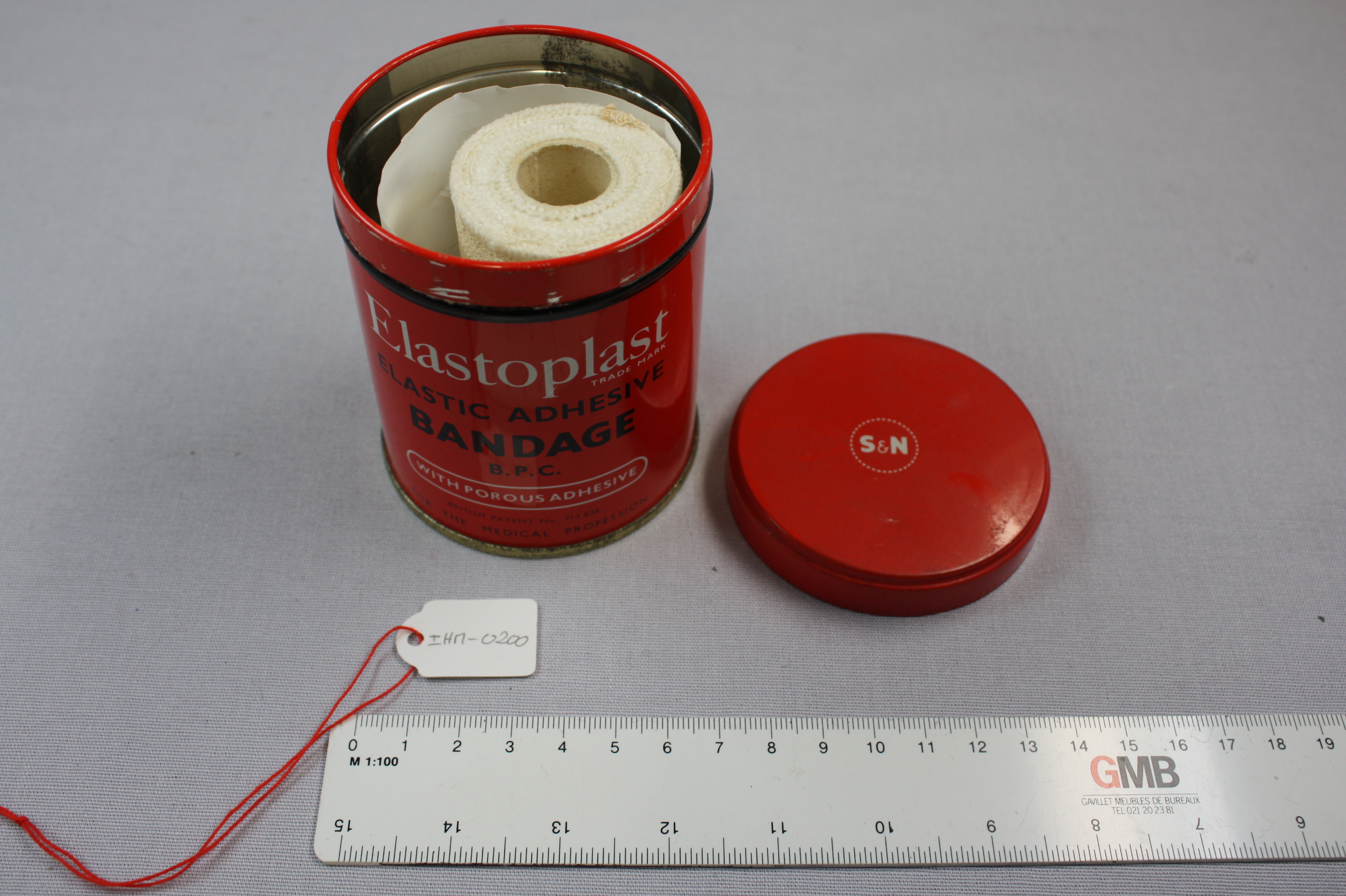
Elastoplast Bandage

Elastoplast is a brand of adhesive bandages (also called sticking plasters) and medical dressing made by Beiersdorf.

== Background ==
In 1928, Smith & Nephew of the UK acquired the licence to market and produce the Elastoplast range of bandages. Beiersdorf bought the brand in 2000.

In some European countries, Hansaplast, a brand name started by Beiersdorf in 1922, is used instead. A third trademark, named Curitas, is used in parts of Latin America.

Nick Kochan wrote about Elastoplast in his book The World's Greatest Brands (1996); noting that "the early success of the brand was due to its high-stretch fabric material coupled with an effective adhesive"; and that it has as strong position in worldwide markets, particularly in the UK.

In the 1970s, Elastoplast marketed its Airstrip product as "the fresh air plaster". The plasters were sold in small flat tin.

On 4 July 2005, Elastoplast launched a £1.1 million advertising campaign which introduced brand heroes called "the Plastermen", which had helped advertise the newly launched SilverHealing plasters.

== See also ==
- Band-Aid
- Henry P. Kendall
- Nexcare
