= 3M =

American multinational corporation

3M Company
- Logo used since 1978

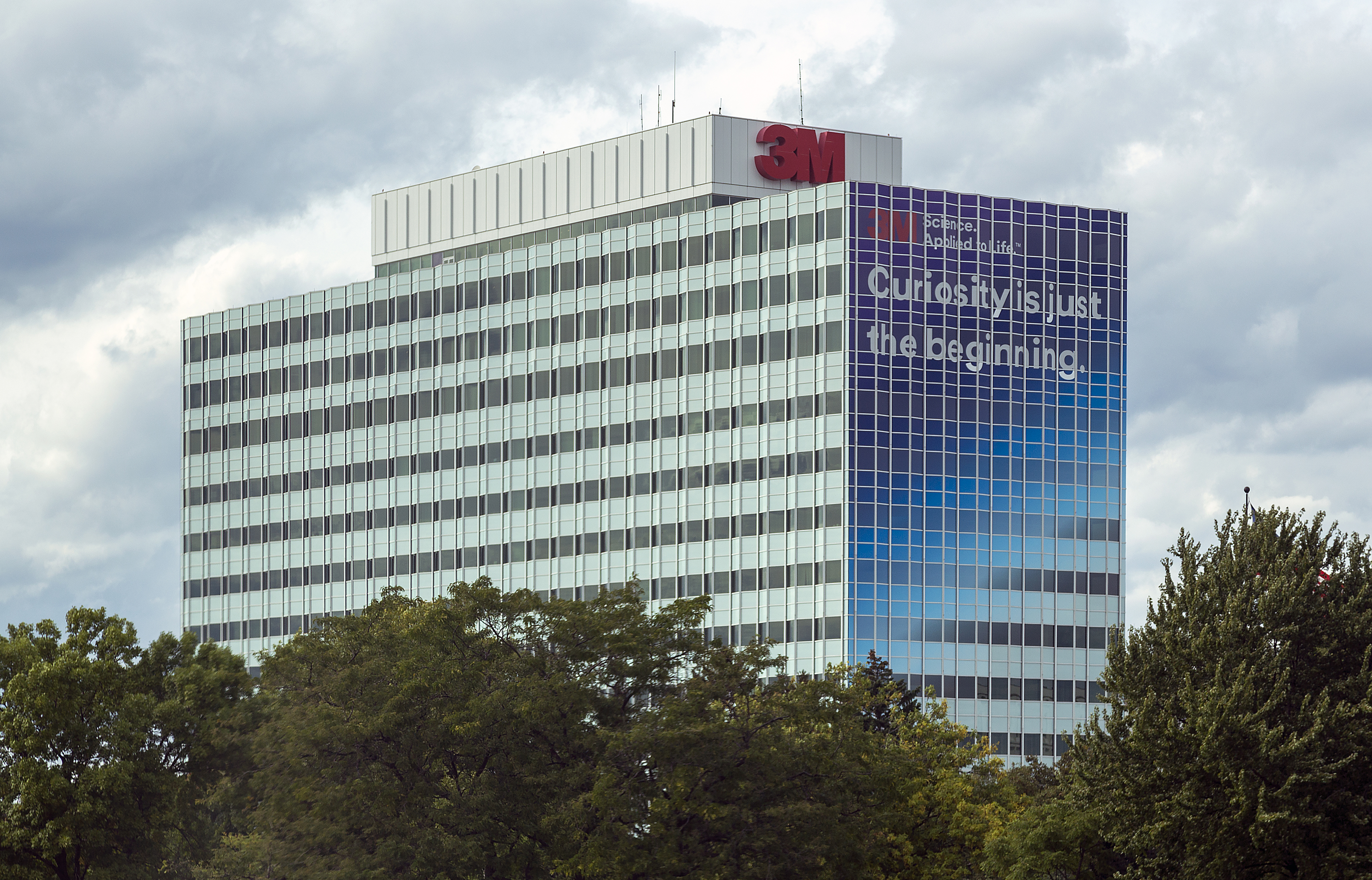
- Headquarters in Maplewood, Minnesota
- Formerly: Minnesota Mining and Manufacturing Company (1902–2002)
- Type: Public
- Traded as: NYSE: MMM; DJIA component; S&P 100 component; S&P 500 component
- ISIN: US88579Y1010
- Industry: Conglomerate
- Founded: June 13, 1902; 124 years ago in Two Harbors, Minnesota, U.S.
- Founders: J. Danley Budd; Henry S. Bryan; William A. McGonagle; John Dwan; Hermon W. Cable; Charles Simmons
- Headquarters: Maplewood, Minnesota, U.S.
- Area served: Worldwide
- Key people: William M. Brown (chairman and CEO)
- Revenue: ▲US$24.9 billion (2025)
- Operating income: ▼US$4.63 billion (2025)
- Net income: ▼US$3.25 billion (2025)
- Total assets: ▼US$37.7 billion (2025)
- Total equity: ▲US$4.70 billion (2025)
- Number of employees: c. 60,500 (2025)
- Website: 3m.com

The 3M Company (originally the Minnesota Mining and Manufacturing Company) is an American multinational conglomerate operating in the fields of industry, worker safety, and consumer goods. Based in the Saint Paul suburb of Maplewood, the company produces over 60,000 products, including adhesives, abrasives, laminates, passive fire protection, personal protective equipment, window films, paint protection film, electrical, electronic connecting, insulating materials, car-care products, electronic circuits, and optical films. Among its best-known consumer brands are Scotch Tape, Scotchgard surface protectants, Post-it notes, and Nexcare adhesive bandages. 3M's stock ticker symbol is MMM and is listed on the New York Stock Exchange, Inc. (NYSE), and the SIX Swiss Exchange.

3M made $35.4 billion in total sales in 2021 and ranked number 102 in the Fortune 500 list of the largest United States corporations by total revenue. As of 2021, the company had approximately 95,000 employees and operations in more than 70 countries. There are a few international subsidiaries, such as 3M India, 3M Japan, and 3M Canada.

== History ==
Five businessmen founded the Minnesota Mining and Manufacturing Company as a mining venture in Two Harbors, Minnesota, making their first sale on June 13, 1902. The goal was to mine corundum, a crystalline form of aluminium oxide, which failed because the mine's mineral holdings were anorthosite, a feldspar which had no commercial value. Co-founder John Dwan solicited funds in exchange for stock and Edgar Ober and Lucius Ordway took over the company in 1905. The company moved to Duluth and began researching and producing sandpaper products. William L. McKnight, later a key executive, joined the company in 1907, and A. G. Bush joined in 1909. 3M finally became financially stable in 1916 and was able to pay dividends.

The company moved to Saint Paul in 1910, where it remained for 52 years before outgrowing the campus and moving to its current headquarters at 3M Center in Maplewood, Minnesota, in 1962.

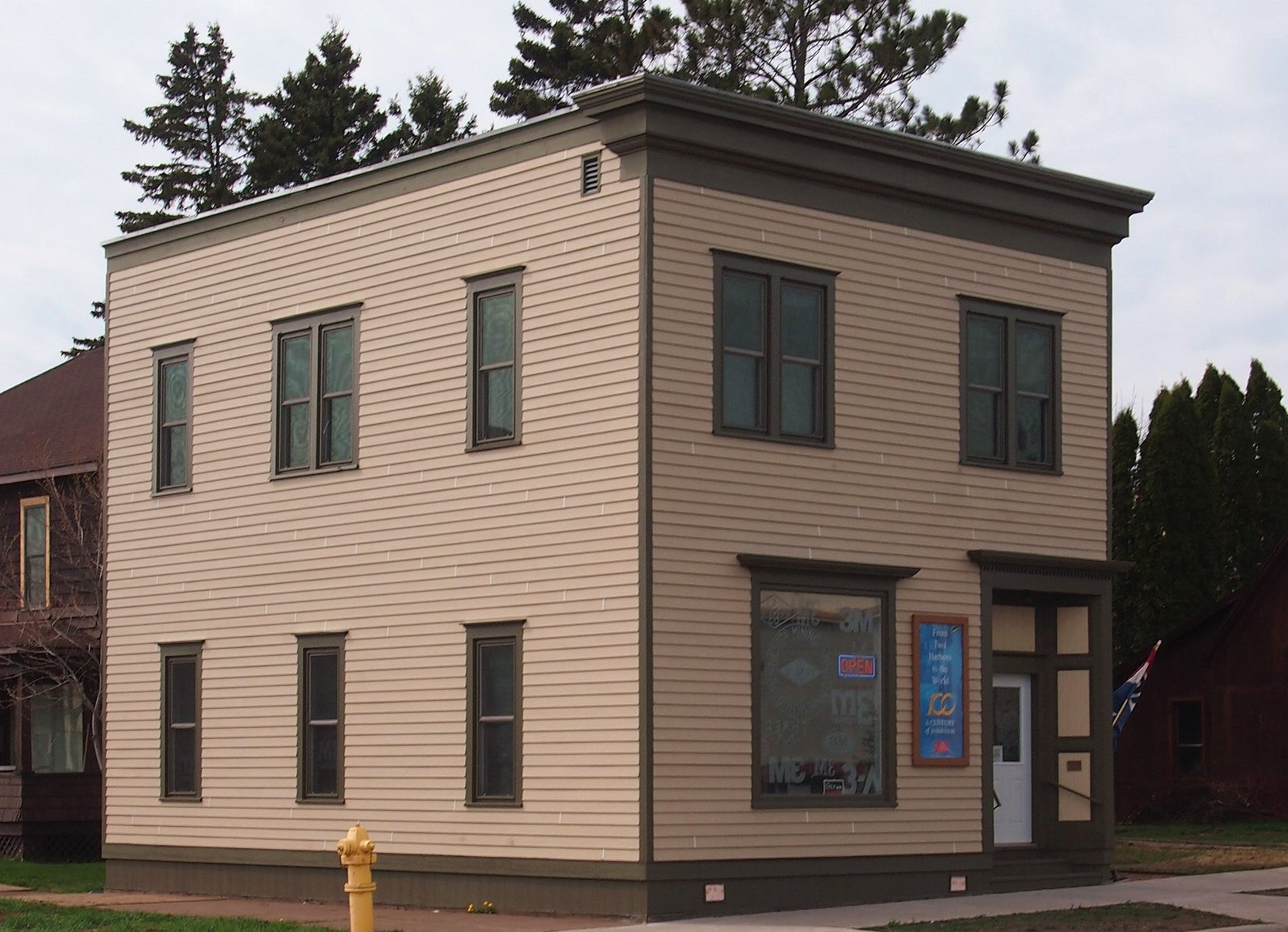
The John Dwan Office Building, where 3M was founded, now a museum

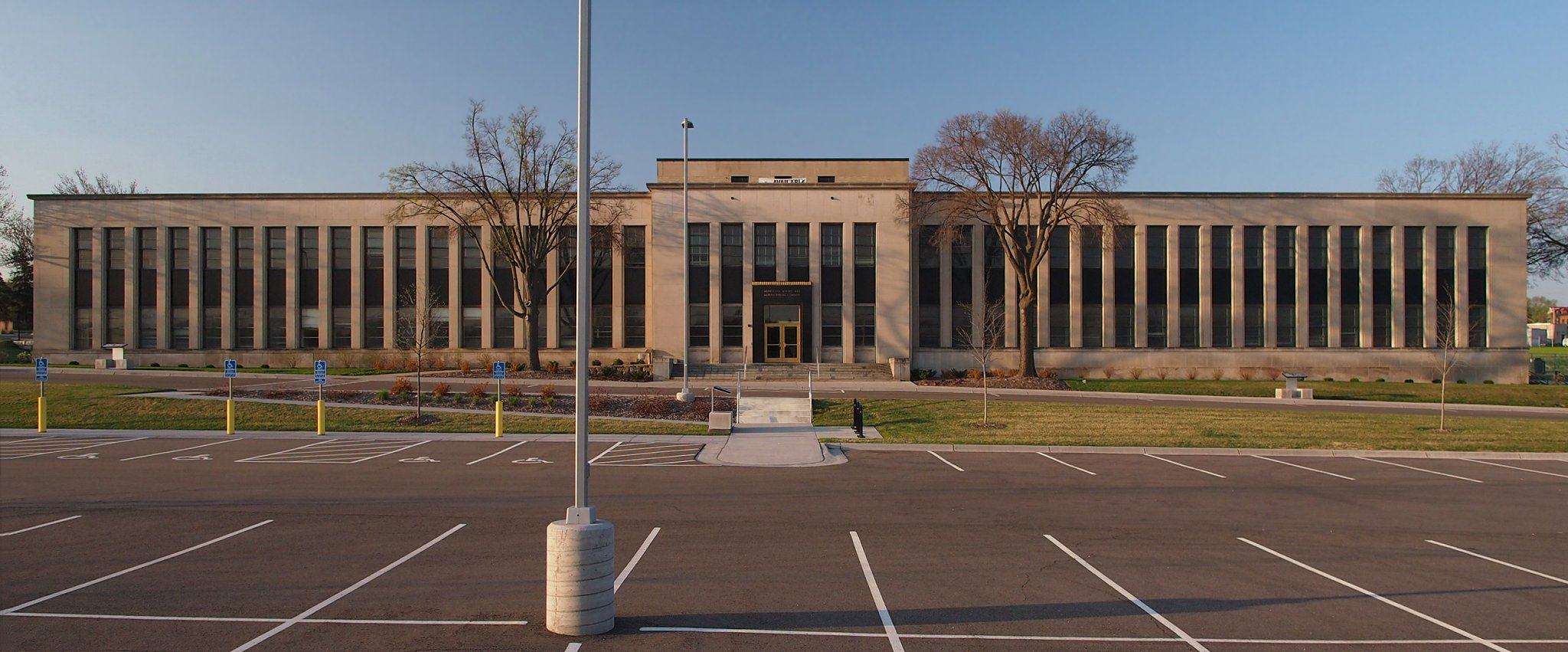
The 3M Administration Building, which served as headquarters from 1940 to 1962

In 1947, 3M began producing perfluorooctanoic acid (PFOA), an industrial surfactant and chemical feedstock, by electrochemical fluorination. In 1951, DuPont purchased PFOA from then-Minnesota Mining and Manufacturing Company for use in the manufacturing of teflon, a product that brought DuPont a billion-dollar-a-year profit by the 1990s. DuPont referred to PFOA as C8. The original formula for Scotchgard, a water repellent applied to fabrics, was discovered accidentally in 1952 by 3M chemists Patsy Sherman and Samuel Smith. Sales began in 1956, and in 1973 the two chemists received a patent for the formula.

In the late 1950s, 3M produced the first asthma inhaler, but the company did not enter the pharmaceutical industry until the mid-1960s with the acquisition of Riker Laboratories, moving it from California to Minnesota. 3M retained the Riker Laboratories name for the subsidiary until at least 1985. In the mid-1990s, 3M Pharmaceuticals, as the division came to be called, produced the first CFC-free asthma inhaler in response to adoption of the Montreal Protocol by the United States. In the 1980s and 1990s, the company spent fifteen years developing a topical cream delivery technology which led in 1997 to health authority approval and marketing of a symptomatic treatment for genital warts, Aldara. 3M divested its pharmaceutical unit through three deals in 2006, netting more than US$2 billion. At the time, 3M Pharmaceuticals comprised about 20% of 3M's healthcare business and employed just over a thousand people.

By the 1970s, 3M developed a theatrical blood formula based on red colorfast microbeads suspended in a carrier liquid. This stage blood was sold as Nextel Simulated Blood and was used during the production of the 1978 film Dawn of the Dead. It has since been discontinued.

In the late 1970s, 3M Mincom was involved in some of the first digital audio recordings to see commercial release when a prototype machine was brought to the Sound 80 studios in Minneapolis. In 1979 3M introduced a digital audio recording system called "3M Digital Audio Mastering System".

3M launched "Press 'n Peel", a sticky bookmark page holder in stores in four cities in 1977, but the results were disappointing. A year later 3M instead issued free samples of the product as a sticky note directly to consumers in Boise, Idaho, with 95% of those who tried them indicating they would buy it. The product was introduced as "Post-Its" in 1979, and was sold across the United States from April 6, 1980. The following year they were launched in Canada and Europe.

In 1980, the company acquired Comtal, a manufacturer of digital image processors.

In 1996, the company's data storage and imaging divisions were spun off as Imation Corporation. In doing so, 3M shed 20% of its sales, employees and product lines at a cost of only 5% of its profits and immediately looked much improved in the estimation of Wall Street analysts. These businesses, with annual sales of over $2 billion, had generated handsome profits for 3M which funded the research and development of many new product lines, but these were largely in "sunset" industries: printing products, photographic film, and removable storage media. Imation shortly sold its imaging and photographic film businesses largely to Kodak in order to concentrate on storage. Imation was purchased by a hedge fund in 2016 and ceased to exist as an independent business. Its successor is now called Glassbridge Enterprises, an American holding company.

=== 21st century ===
3M wordmark used from 1961 to 1978

On April 8, 2002, 3M's 100th anniversary, the company changed its legal name to "3M Company". On September 8, 2008, 3M announced an agreement to acquire Meguiar's, a car-care products company that was family-owned for over a century. In August 2010, 3M acquired Cogent Systems for $943 million, and on October 13, 2010, 3M completed acquisition of Arizant Inc. In December 2011, 3M completed the acquisition of the Winterthur Technology Group, a bonded abrasives company.

In 2011, 3M created CloudLibrary as part of its library systems unit as a competitor to OverDrive, Inc.; in 2015 3M sold the North American part of that unit to Bibliotheca Group GmbH, a company founded in 2011 that was funded by One Equity Partners Capital Advisors, a division of JP Morgan Chase.

As of 2012, 3M was one of the 30 companies included in the Dow Jones Industrial Average, added on August 9, 1976, and was 97 on the 2011 Fortune 500 list. On January 3, 2012, it was announced that the Office and Consumer Products Division of Avery Dennison was being bought by 3M for $550 million. The transaction was canceled by 3M in September 2012 amid antitrust concerns.

In May 2013, 3M sold Scientific Anglers and Ross Reels to Orvis. Ross Reels had been acquired by 3M in 2010.

In March 2017, 3M purchased Johnson Controls International Plc's safety gear business, Scott Safety, for $2 billion.

In 2017, 3M had net sales for the year of $31.657 billion, up from $30.109 billion the year before. In 2018, it was reported that the company would pay $850 million to end the Minnesota water pollution case concerning perfluorochemicals.

On May 25, 2018, Michael F. Roman was appointed CEO by the board of directors. On December 19, 2018, 3M announced it had entered into a definitive agreement to acquire the technology business of M*Modal, for a total enterprise value of $1.0 billion.

In October 2019, 3M purchased Acelity and its KCI subsidiaries for $6.7 billion, including assumption of debt and other adjustments.

On May 1, 2020, 3M divested substantially all of its drug delivery business to an affiliate of Altaris Capital Partners, LLC. for approximately $650 million, including a 17% interest in the new operating company, Kindeva Drug Delivery.

In December 2021, 3M announced that it would merge its food-safety business with food testing and animal healthcare products maker Neogen. The deal, with an enterprise value of about $5.3 billion, closed in September 2022.

In July 2022, the company announced it would spin off its healthcare assets to form a new, independent firm, likely completing the transaction in 2023. 3M will retain an ownership stake of 19.9% in the new, publicly traded health care company and gradually divest the holdings. The company will be known as Solventum Corporation.

In December 2022, the company announced plans to stop producing and using so-called forever chemicals (per and polyfluoroalkyl), which have been commonly used in items such as food packaging, cellphones, nonstick pans, firefighting foams, and clothing. These chemicals are well known for their water-resistant and nonstick properties, but they are also dangerous pollutants that are linked to serious health problems, including ulcerative colitis and cancer. The move comes as governments in the Netherlands and the United States consider actions against 3M.

In March 2024, 3M announced the appointment of William "Bill" Brown as chief executive officer to take effect on May 1, 2024. Michael Roman would remain in the role of executive chairman. Brown, 61, is the former chairman of the board and chief executive officer of L3Harris Technologies.

== Products and patents ==
As of 2019, 3M produces approximately 60,000 products, and has four business groups focused on safety and industrial, transportation and electronics, health care, and consumer products. 3M obtained its first patent in 1924 and acquires approximately 3,000 new patents annually. The company surpassed the 100,000-patent threshold in 2014.

== Environmental record ==
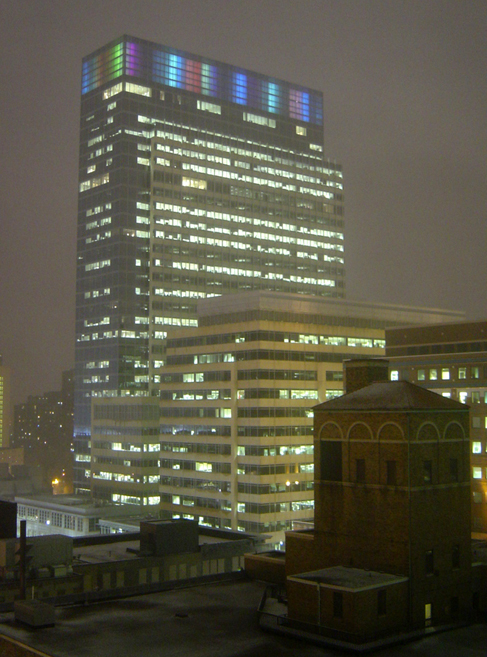
The Target Light System, built by 3M at Target headquarters in Minneapolis

3M's Pollution Prevention Pays (3P) program was established in 1975. The program initially focused on pollution reduction at the plant level and was expanded to promote recycling and reduce waste across all divisions in 1989. By the early 1990s, approximately 2,500 3P projects decreased the company's total global pollutant generation by 50 percent and saved 3M $500–600 million by eliminating the production of waste requiring subsequent treatment.

In 1983, the Oakdale Dump in Oakdale, Minnesota, was listed as an EPA Superfund site after significant groundwater and soil contamination by VOCs and heavy metals was uncovered. The Oakdale Dump was a 3M dumping site utilized through the 1940s and 1950s.

During the 1990s and 2000s, 3M reduced releases of toxic pollutants by 99 percent and greenhouse gas emissions by 72 percent. As of 2012, the United States Environmental Protection Agency (EPA) had awarded 3M with the Energy Star Award each year that it has been presented.

=== "Forever chemicals" water pollution ===
In 1999, the EPA began investigating perfluorinated chemicals after receiving data on the global distribution and toxicity of perfluorooctanesulfonic acid (PFOS). These materials are part of a broad group of perfluoroalkyl and polyfluoroalkyl substances often referred to as PFAS, each of which has different chemical properties. 3M, the former primary producer of PFOS from the U.S., announced the phase-out of PFOS, perfluorooctanoic acid, and PFOS-related product production in May 2000. Perfluorinated compounds produced by 3M have been used in non-stick cookware, stain-resistant fabrics, and other products.

The Cottage Grove facility manufactured PFAS from the 1940s to 2002. In response to PFAS contamination of the Mississippi River and surrounding area, 3M stated the area will be "cleaned through a combination of groundwater pump-out wells and soil sediment excavation". The restoration plan was based on an analysis of the company property and surrounding lands. The on-site water treatment facility that handled the plant's post-production water was not capable of removing PFAS, which were released into the nearby Mississippi River. The clean-up cost estimate, which included a granular activated carbon system to remove PFAS from the ground water was $50 to $56 million, funded from a $147 million environmental reserve set aside in 2006.

In 2008, 3M created the Renewable Energy Division within 3M's Industrial and Transportation Business to focus on Energy Generation and Energy Management.

In late 2010, the state of Minnesota sued 3M for $5 billion in punitive damages, claiming they released PFCs—classified a toxic chemical by the EPA—into local waterways. A settlement for $850 million was reached in February 2018. In 2019, 3M, along with the Chemours Company and DuPont, appeared before lawmakers to deny responsibility, with company Senior VP of Corporate Affairs Denise Rutherford arguing that the chemicals pose no human health threats at current levels and that there were no victims.

In 2021, research had determined that 3M's Zwijndrecht (Belgium) factory caused PFOS pollution that may be contaminating agricultural products within a 15 kilometer radius of the plant which includes Antwerp. The Flemish Government has paid 63 million euros for cleanup costs so far with 3M contributing 75,000 euros. The Flemish Government issued measures advising against the consumption of, for example, home-grown eggs within a radius of 5 kilometers.

In 2023, 3M reached an agreement to pay a $10.3bn settlement with numerous US public water systems to resolve thousands of lawsuits over PFAS contamination.

In May 2026, the Australian government launched legal action against 3M, alleging that the company made false statements regarding the long-term environmental impacts of firefighting foam containing PFAS. The government is seeking more than A$2 billion in damages to recover costs incurred in investigating and managing contamination resulting from the use of the foam. The government described the lawsuit as the largest legal claim ever brought by Australia. Assistant Defence Minister Peter Khalil stated that 28 defence sites across Australia had been impacted by PFAS contamination.

=== Carbon footprint ===
3M reported total CO2e emissions (direct and indirect) for the twelve months ending December 31, 2020, at 5,280 Kt (-550 /-9.4% y-o-y) and plans to reduce emissions by 50% by 2030 compared to 2019. The company also aims to achieve carbon neutrality by 2050.

3M's total annual CO2e emissions – location-based Scope 1 + Scope 2 (in kilotonnes)
Dec 2014	Dec 2015	Dec 2016	Dec 2017	Dec 2018	Dec 2019	Dec 2020
6,630	5,630	5,980	5,840	6,650	5,830	5,280

== Earplug controversy ==
The Combat Arms Earplugs, Version 2 (CAEv2), was developed by Aearo Technologies for U.S. military and civilian use. The CAEv2 was a double ended earplug that 3M claimed would offer users different levels of protection. Between 2003 and 2015, these earplugs were standard issue to members of the U.S. military. 3M acquired Aearo Technologies in 2008.

In May 2016, Moldex-Metric, Inc., a 3M competitor, filed a whistleblower complaint against 3M under the False Claims Act. Moldex-Metric claimed that 3M made false claims to the U.S. government about the safety of its earplugs and that it knew the earplugs had an inherently defective design. In 2018, 3M agreed to pay $9.1 million to the U.S. government to resolve the allegations, without admitting liability.

Since 2018, more than 140,000 former users of the earplugs (primarily U.S. military veterans) have filed suit against 3M claiming they suffer from hearing loss, tinnitus, and other damage as a consequence of the defective design.

Internal emails showed that 3M officials boasted about charging $7.63 per piece for the earplugs which cost 85 cents to produce. The company's official response indicated that the cost to the government includes R&D costs.

3M settled close to 260,000 lawsuits in August 2023 by agreeing to pay $6 billion to current and former U.S. military members who were affected.

== N95 respirators and the COVID-19 pandemic ==
The N95 respirator mask was developed by 3M and approved in 1972. Due to its ability to filter viral particulates, its use was recommended during the COVID-19 pandemic but supply soon became short. Much of the company's supply had already been sold prior to the outbreak.

The shortages led to the U.S. government asking 3M to stop exporting US-made N95 respirator masks to Canada and to Latin American countries, and President Donald Trump invoked the Defense Production Act to require 3M to prioritize orders from the federal government. The dispute was resolved when 3M agreed to import more respirators, mostly from its factories in China.

3M later struck a CA$70M deal with the federal government of Canada and the Ontario provincial government to produce N95 masks at their plant in Brockville, Ontario.

== Operating facilities ==
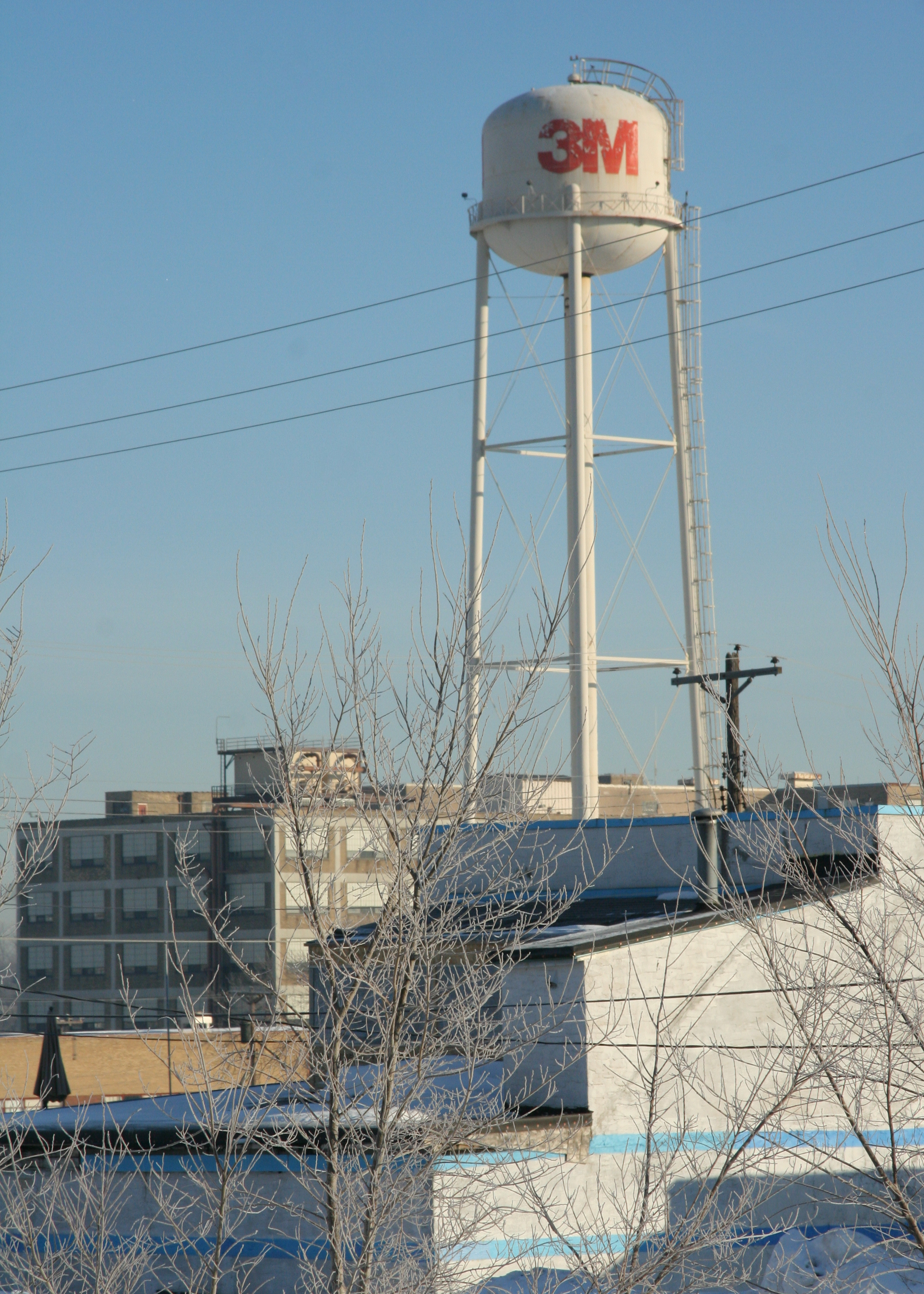
Former 3M facility in St. Paul, Minnesota

3M's general offices, corporate research laboratories, and some division laboratories in the U.S. are in St. Paul, Minnesota. In the United States, 3M operates 80 manufacturing facilities in 29 states, and 125 manufacturing and converting facilities in 37 countries outside the U.S. (in 2017).

During March 2016, 3M completed a 400,000-square-foot (37,000 m^{2}) research-and-development building on its Maplewood campus that cost $150 million. Seven hundred scientists from various divisions occupy the building. They were previously scattered across the campus. 3M hopes concentrating its research and development in this manner will improve collaboration. 3M received $9.6 million in local tax increment financing and relief from state sales taxes in order to assist with development of the building.

Selected factory detail information:

- Cynthiana, Kentucky, U.S. factory producing Post-it Notes (672 SKU) and Scotch Tape (147 SKU). It has 539 employees and was established in 1969.
- Newton Aycliffe, County Durham, UK factory producing respirators for workers safety using laser technology. It has 370 employees.
- In Minnesota, 3M's Hutchinson facility produces products for more than half of the company's 23 divisions, as of 2019. The "super hub" has manufactured adhesive bandages for Nexcare, furnace filters, and Scotch Tape, among other products. The Cottage Grove plant is one of three operated by 3M for the production of pad conditioners, as of 2011.
- 3M has operated a manufacturing plant in Columbia, Missouri since 1970. The plant has been used for the production of products including electronic components solar and touchscreen films, and stethoscopes. The facility received a $20 million expansion in 2012 and has approximately 400 employees.
- 3M opened the Brookings, South Dakota plant in 1971, and announced a $70 million expansion in 2014. The facility manufactures more than 1,700 health care products and employs 1,100 people, as of 2018, making the plant 3M's largest focused on health care. Mask production at the site increased during the 2009 swine flu pandemic, 2002–2004 SARS outbreak, 2018 California wildfires, 2019–20 Australian bushfire season, and COVID-19 pandemic.
- 3M's Springfield, Missouri plant opened in 1967 and makes industrial adhesives and tapes for aerospace manufacturers. In 2017, 3M had approximately 330 employees in the metropolitan area, and announced a $40 million expansion project to upgrade the facility and redevelop another building.
- In Iowa, the Ames plant makes sandpaper products and received funding from the Iowa Economic Development Authority (IEDA) for expansions in 2013 and 2018. The Knoxville plant is among 3M's largest and produces approximately 12,000 different products, including adhesives and tapes.
- 3M's Southeast Asian operations are based in Singapore, where the company has invested $1 billion over 50 years. 3M has a facility in Tuas, a manufacturing plant and Smart Urban Solutions lab in Woodlands, and a customer technical center in Yishun. 3M expanded a factory in Woodlands in 2011, announced a major expansion of the Tuas plant in 2016, and opened new headquarters in Singapore featuring a Customer Technical Centre in 2018.
- The company has operated in China since 1984, and was Shanghai's first Wholly Foreign-Owned Enterprise. 3M's seventh plant, and the first dedicated to health care product production, opened in Shanghai in 2007. By October 2007, the company had opened an eighth manufacturing plant and technology center in Guangzhou. 3M broke ground on its ninth manufacturing facility, for the production of photovoltaics and other renewable energy products, in Hefei in 2011. 3M announced plans to construct a technology innovation center in Chengdu in 2015, and opened a fifth design center in Shanghai in 2019.

== Leadership ==
=== President ===
1. Edgar B. Ober (1905–1929),
2. William L. McKnight (1929–1949),
3. Richard P. Carlton (1949–1953),
4. Herbert P. Buetow (1953–1963),
5. Bert S. Cross (1963–1966),
6. Harry Heltzer (1966–1970),
7. Raymond H. Herzog (1970–1975).

=== Chairman of the Board ===
1. William L. McKnight (1949–1966),
2. Bert S. Cross (1966–1970),
3. Harry Heltzer (1970–1975),
4. Raymond H. Herzog (1975–1980),
5. Lewis W. Lehr (1980–1986)
6. Allen F. Jacobson (1986–1991),
7. Livio DeSimone (1991–2001),
8. James McNerney (2001–2005),
9. George W. Buckley (2005–2012),
10. Inge Thulin (2012–2018).

=== Chief Executive Officer ===
1. Bert S. Cross (1966–1970),
2. Harry Heltzer (1970–1975),
3. Raymond H. Herzog (1975–1979),
4. Lewis W. Lehr (1979–1986),
5. Allen F. Jacobson (1986–1991),
6. Livio DeSimone (1991–2001),
7. James McNerney (2001–2005),
8. Robert S. Morrison (2005, interim),
9. George W. Buckley (2005–2012),
10. Inge Thulin (2012–2018)
11. Michael Roman (2018–2024)
12. William M. Brown (2024-present)

== See also ==
- Oakdale Dump

=== Further reading ===
- V. Huck, Brand of the Tartan: The 3M Story, Appleton-Century-Crofts, 1955. Early history of 3M and challenges, includes employee profiles.
- C. Rimington, From Minnesota mining and manufacturing to 3M Australia Pty Ltd (3M Australia: the Story of an Innovative Company), Sid Harta Publishers, 2013. Recollections from 3M Australia employees in context of broader organisational history.
- Sharon Lerner "How 3M Discovered, Then Concealed, the Dangers of Forever Chemicals", New Yorker Magazine
