= Twin Cities Army Ammunition Plant =

Former United States Army ammunition plant in Minnesota

Coordinates: 45°06′N 93°10′W

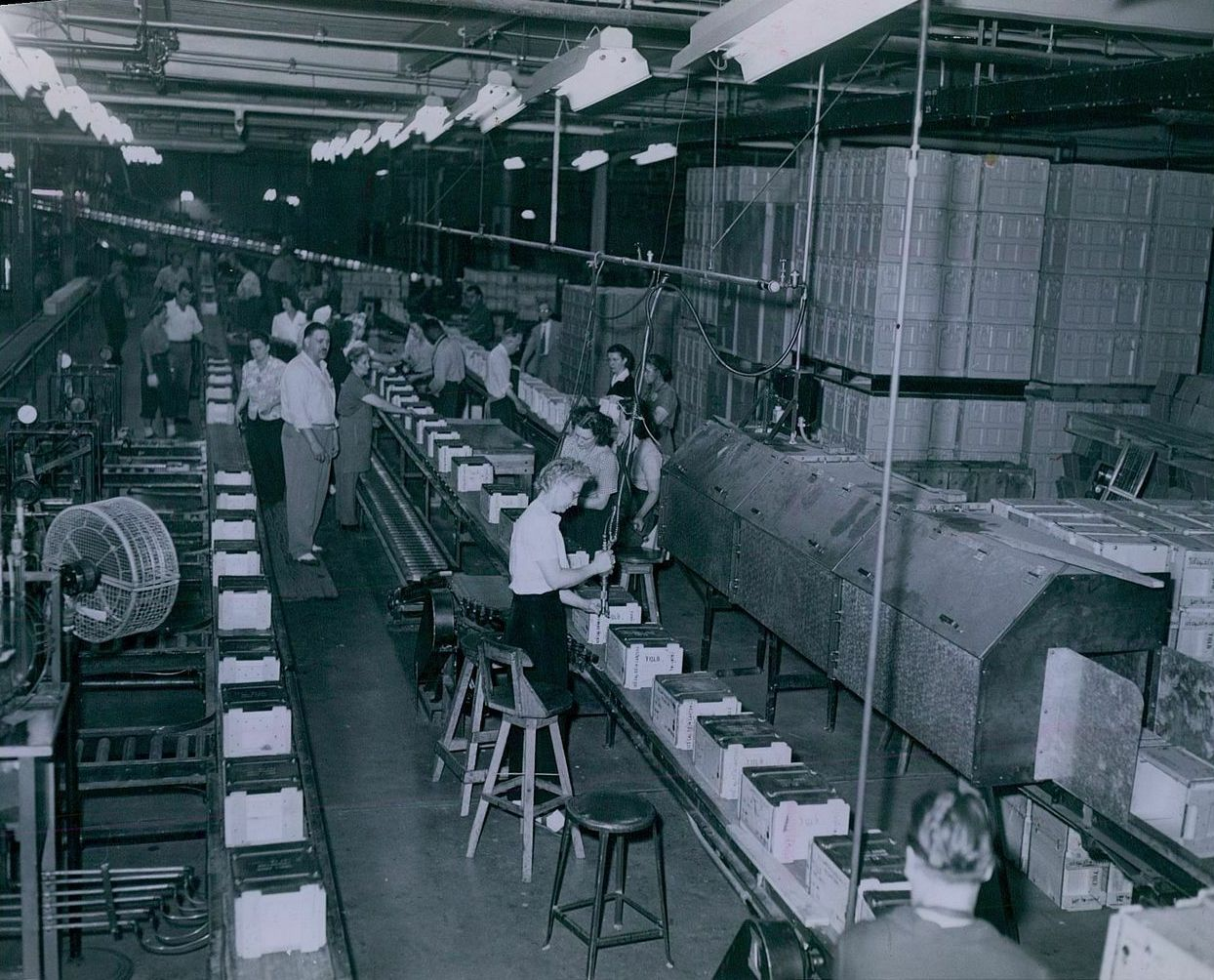
Workers at the Twin Cities Ordnance Plant, 1946

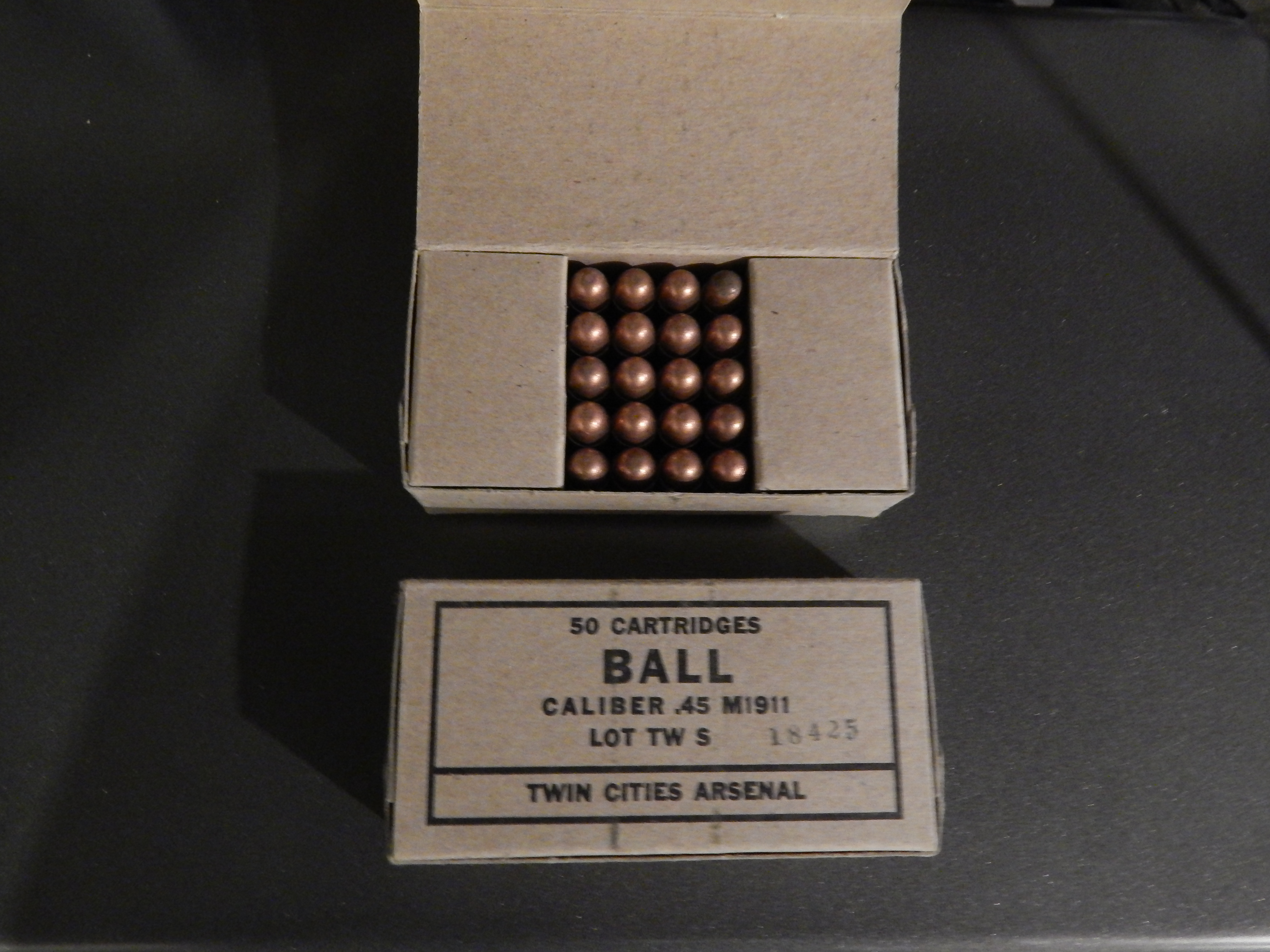
Fifty round package of .45 ball ammunition from 1948

The Twin Cities Army Ammunition Plant was a United States Army ammunition plant located in Ramsey County, Minnesota in the current boundaries of the suburbs of Arden Hills and New Brighton, bounded by County Road I to the north, I-35W to the west, U.S. Route 10 to the southwest, County Highway 96 to the south, and Lexington Avenue to the east. Initially, the plant was known as the Twin Cities Ordnance Plant but it was renamed the Twin Cities Arsenal in 1946 and finally, in 1963, the Twin Cities Army Ammunition Plant.

The site was added to the National Priorities List as a Superfund site on September 8, 1983. The soil, sediments, groundwater, and surface water surrounding the plant were contaminated with base neutral acids, metals, polycyclic aromatic hydrocarbons, polychlorinated biphenyls, volatile organic compounds, pesticides, cyanide, and explosives. These contaminants entered Rice Creek and from there the ground water in New Brighton.

The site had 255 buildings across 2,382 acres (9.64 km^{2}). Current land redevelopment involves the removal of these buildings.

== History ==
The facility was founded as the Twin Cities Ordinance Plant, set up as a joint venture between the United States Department of War and the Federal Cartridge Corporation. In 1941, the Federal Cartridge Corporation won an $87 million contract to build and operate the facility under the Lend-Lease Act, while ownership would remain with the military. One of six government-owned, contractor-operated small arms ammunition plants set up during World War II under the Lend-Lease Act, the original 100 building complex was completed over a period of six months, and the plant began production in March 1942, with an initial mandate of supplying .30 Caliber, .50 Caliber, and .45 Auto ammunition, later expanded to other types of military equipment.

The plant would expand over the next year, consisting of around 300 buildings by 1943. At this time, there were over 20,000 employees at the plant, over half of them women. The plant also employed many African-Americans, at its peak employing around a fifth of the state's black population. Cecil Newman, a civic leader from Minneapolis, worked alongside Charles L. Horn, then-president of the Federal Cartridge Corporation, to promote the employment and career advancement of African-Americans at the plant during its early years. Newman was eventually given a permanent position as the Director of Negro Personnel at the plant, while Horn was later tapped by President Roosevelt to join the Fair Employment Practice Committee, a federal committee tasked with assisting the enforcement of Executive Order 8802, an anti-discrimination order signed by Roosevelt targeting the defense industry.

Production also expanded, with components of artillery shells being produced beginning in early 1945. In 1944 it began overhauling old .30- and .50-caliber ammunition by the use of machines that disassembled them into their components. It closed in September, 1945 due to the ending of the fighting in the Pacific. It was reopened on a reserve basis as the Twin Cities Arsenal from 1946 to 1950. The demands of the Korean War restored full production from 1950 until it was closed down in 1957. It was renamed as the Twin Cities Army Ammunition Plant in 1963. The demand for the new 5.56mm NATO and 7.62mm NATO cartridges during the Vietnam War made it reopen briefly from 1965 to 1976. It was in standby from 1976 to 2002 and was finally closed in 2005.

== Future of Site ==
=== Environmental concerns ===
In July 1981, significant volatile organic compound contamination of the water supply in New Brighton was identified. The contamination consisted of Trichloroethylene (TCE) at levels ranging from a few parts per billion to over two hundred parts per billion. The army ammunition plant was positively identified as the source of the contamination in 1987. Trichloroethylene is a solvent that is commonly used in industrial processes, primarily as a degreaser for metal parts, but is also known as a carcinogen. Waste solvents produced by the plant were disposed of into the ground, a common practice for the time, and were able to filter through the sandy sediment on the site to reach two large groundwater plumes used by the water supplys of New Brighton and nearby St. Anthony.

=== Redevelopment ===
After a bid to make TCAAP the new home for the Minnesota Vikings failed, the Ramsey County Board of Commissioners approved the purchase of the surplus acreage that remains on the original 2,700 acre TCAAP site. This 427-acre parcel will be redeveloped in conjunction with the City of Arden Hills. Under terms of the deal, the county will pay the federal government $4.9 million for the property and agree to spend $22.6 million to clean up remaining pollution. In April 2013, the County executed a competitively bid contract with Carl Bolander & Sons of St. Paul for the demolition of all structures on site, and the full remediation of the site to residential soil values As of October 2013, Bolander and Sons had removed all of the above grade buildings but one, and had begun soil remediation activities. The county will finance the deal with $21.4 million in bonding, a $6 million transfer from its solid waste fund and $2 million in contingency funds. These dollars will be replenished through the sale of land for redevelopment.

Through a Joint Powers Agreement (JPA), the City of Arden Hills and Ramsey County have created a Joint Development Authority (JDA). This entity will be responsible for implementing the City and County approved Master Plan for the site, issuing Requests for Proposals (RFPs), and negotiating development agreements with private developers. The JDA meets monthly, on the first Monday of the month, at Arden Hills City Hall at 5:30 p.m.

Following the approval of a final development proposal by the Joint Development Authority, groundbreaking for the Rice Creek Commons project began on the TCAAP site in April 2025. The Rice Creek Commons project is planned as a mixture of single- and multi-family housing as well as retail and commercial space.

== See also ==
- List of Superfund sites in Minnesota
