= Oakdale, Minnesota =

City in Minnesota, United States

Oakdale
- City
- Seal

- Location of the city of Oakdale within Washington County, Minnesota
- Coordinates: 44°59′14″N 92°57′57″W
- Country: United States
- State: Minnesota
- County: Washington
- Oakdale Township: 1848
- Organized: May and November 1858
- Incorporated: March 12, 1968

Government
  - Mayor: Kevin Zabel

Area
  - Total: 11.31 sq mi (29.29 km^{2})
  - Land: 10.96 sq mi (28.39 km^{2})
  - Water: 0.35 sq mi (0.90 km^{2})
- Elevation: 1,056 ft (322 m)

Population (2020)
  - Total: 28,303
  - Estimate (2022): 27,799
  - Density: 2,582.3/sq mi (997.03/km^{2})
- Time zone: UTC-6 (Central)
  - Summer (DST): UTC-5 (CDT)
- ZIP codes: 55042, 55128
- Area code: 651
- FIPS code: 27-47680
- GNIS feature ID: 2395287
- Website: oakdalemn.gov

Oakdale is a city in Washington County, Minnesota, United States. It is a suburb of Saint Paul in the eastern Twin Cities Metropolitan area. The population was 28,303 at the 2020 census. Oakdale is Minnesota's 36th-largest city by population.

Oakdale lies entirely within the North St. Paul–Maplewood–Oakdale school district, ISD 622, and the city's students are split into two high schools within the district. Tartan Senior High School is within the city's boundaries, and serves the southern half of Oakdale. The city's northern residents are served by North High School in North St. Paul.

The 45th parallel runs directly through Oakdale, bisecting the city generally along Upper 35th Street North. This marks the halfway point between the Equator and the North Pole. At Tilsen Park, the 45th parallel runs directly through the baseball field's home plate.

Imation World Headquarters was in Oakdale. Nearby 3M headquarters employs many residents of the city.

== Etymology ==
Oakdale was named for a grove of oak trees near the original town site. Oakdale Township was organized in 1858. The city of Oakdale is the result of a consolidation of Oakdale and Northdale Townships in the 1970s, and continued to annex land well into the 1990s.

Arthur Stephen suggested the name "OakDale" at the first town meeting on November 1, 1858. Stephen was born on March 30, 1830, in Scotland. He was the son of Robert and Elizabeth (Grant) Stephen. In 1839, when Arthur was nine years old, the Stephen family came to America and settled in Knox County, Illinois. His father was a schoolteacher and young Arthur learned the trade of bricklayer.

== Geography ==
According to the United States Census Bureau, the city has an area of 11.29 square miles (29.24 km^{2}); 10.95 square miles (28.36 km^{2}) is land and 0.34 square miles (0.88 km^{2}) is water.

Oakdale is bounded by Minnesota State Highway 120 on its west, Washington County Road 13 on its east, Interstate 694 on its north, and Interstate 94 on its south. Other main routes in the city include Minnesota State Highway 36, and Hadley Avenue North, which Oakdale designates its "signature street" since it is the primary street running the length of the city.

== Demographics ==
Historical population
Census	Pop.	Note	%±
1970	7,795		—
1980	12,123		55.5%
1990	18,374		51.6%
2000	26,653		45.1%
2010	27,378		2.7%
2020	28,303		3.4%
2022 (est.)	27,799		−1.8%
U.S. Decennial Census; 2020 Census

=== 2020 census ===
As of the 2020 census, Oakdale had a population of 28,303 and a population density of 2,584.8 inhabitants per square mile (998.0/km^{2}).

100.0% of residents lived in urban areas.

There were 11,304 households in Oakdale, of which 27.5% had children under 18 living in them. Of all households, 45.8% were married-couple households, 16.9% were households with a male householder and no spouse or partner present, and 29.1% were households with a female householder and no spouse or partner present. About 30.1% of all households were made up of individuals and 13.0% had someone living alone who was 65 or older. The average household size was 2.45 and the average family size was 3.02.

The median age was 39.4. 21.5% of residents were under 18, 9.9% were between 18 and 24, 22.4% were from 25 to 44, 29.0% were from 45 to 64, and 16.5% were 65 or older. For every 100 females there were 92.9 males, and for every 100 females age 18 and over there were 90.5 males age 18 and over.

There were 11,648 housing units, at an average density of 1,063.8 per square mile (410.7/km^{2}), of which 3.0% were vacant. The homeowner vacancy rate was 0.5% and the rental vacancy rate was 4.6%.

Racial composition as of the 2020 census
Race	Number	Percent
White	19,126	67.6%
Black or African American	2,903	10.3%
American Indian and Alaska Native	144	0.5%
Asian	3,494	12.3%
Native Hawaiian and Other Pacific Islander	13	0.0%
Some other race	785	2.8%
Two or more races	1,838	6.5%
Hispanic or Latino (of any race)	1,753	6.2%

=== 2010 census ===
As of the census of 2010, there were 27,378 people, 10,948 households, and 7,152 families living in the city. The population density was 2,500.3 inhabitants per square mile (965.4/km^{2}). There were 11,388 housing units at an average density of 1,040.0 per square mile (401.5/km^{2}). The racial makeup of the city was 81.4% White, 6.0% African American, 0.4% Native American, 8.2% Asian, 1.2% from other races, and 2.8% from two or more races. Hispanic or Latino of any race were 4.3% of the population.

There were 10,948 households, of which 33.0% had children under the age of 18 living with them, 48.2% were married couples living together, 12.7% had a female householder with no husband present, 4.4% had a male householder with no wife present, and 34.7% were non-families. 28.4% of all households were made up of individuals, and 9.5% had someone living alone who was 65 years of age or older. The average household size was 2.48 and the average family size was 3.07.

The median age in the city was 37.9 years. 24.1% of residents were under the age of 18; 9.4% were between the ages of 18 and 24; 26% were from 25 to 44; 29.2% were from 45 to 64; and 11.2% were 65 years of age or older. The gender makeup of the city was 27.9% male and 52.1% female.

=== 2000 census ===
As of the census of 2000, there were 26,653 people, 10,243 households, and 7,129 families living in the city. The population density was 2,408.4 inhabitants per square mile (929.9/km^{2}). There were 10,394 housing units at an average density of 939.2 per square mile (362.6/km^{2}). The racial makeup of the city was 92.21% White, 2.29% African American, 0.36% Native American, 2.45% Asian, 0.01% Pacific Islander, 0.77% from other races, and 1.91% from two or more races. Hispanic or Latino of any race were 2.75% of the population.

There were 10,243 households, of which 38.5% had children under the age of 18 living with them, 55.2% were married couples living together, 11.1% had a female householder with no husband present, and 30.4% were non-families. 25.2% of all households were made up of individuals, and 7.2% had someone living alone who was 65 years of age or older. The average household size was 2.59 and the average family size was 3.14.

In the city, the population was spread out, with 29.0% under the age of 18, 7.2% from 18 to 24, 34.6% from 25 to 44, 20.7% from 45 to 64, and 8.4% who were 65 years of age or older. The median age was 34 years. For every 100 females, there were 93.1 males. For every 100 females age 18 and over, there were 87.0 males.

The median income for a household in the city was $56,299, and the median income for a family was $66,680. Males had a median income of $42,371 versus $32,343 for females. The per capita income was $24,107. About 2.9% of families and 3.6% of the population were below the poverty line, including 4.1% of those under age 18 and 3.9% of those age 65 or over.

== Superfund site and environmental damage ==
The Oakdale Dump is listed as a United States Environmental Protection Agency Superfund site due to the contamination of residential drinking water wells with volatile organic compounds (VOCs) and heavy metals. After extensive cleanup, the area was converted into a city park.

== Notable people ==
- Jerome J. Belisle, member of the Minnesota House of Representatives
- Derek Chauvin, former Minneapolis police officer who murdered George Floyd
- Patricia Mueller, member of the Minnesota House of Representatives
- Bill Young, comedian
