= Harry Heltzer =

Harry Heltzer (August 22, 1911 – September 21, 2005) was the chairman and chief executive officer of 3M from 1970 to 1975. Heltzer was also president of 3M from 1966 to 1970. Heltzer was forced to resign from 3M amidst allegations of improper campaign contributions during the Nixon years. Heltzer later divorced his wife Bernice (Lejcher). He remarried and moved to Lenoir, North Carolina. Early at Minnesota Mining, he co-invented Scotch-Lite, a glass bead coating for road signs and highway paints to provide retroreflective illumination.

Heltzer was inducted into the ARTBA Transportation Development Foundation Hall of Fame in 2012. He is recognized by ARTBA for his work at 3M with reflective coating and being known as the "father of reflective materials."
