= Oakdale Dump =

Environmental Protection Agency Superfund site located in Oakdale, Minnesota

The Oakdale Dump is an Environmental Protection Agency Superfund site located in Oakdale, Minnesota, and comprises three non-contiguous properties that were used for dumping from the late 1940s until the 1950s by the 3M corporation. The properties are named the Abresch, Brockman, and Eberle sites for their respective property owners at the time of disposal activities. The Abresch site is the largest of the three properties at about 55 acres. The Brockman site is located immediately southwest of the Abresch site and encompasses 5 acres. The Eberle site is located roughly 2,500 feet north of the Abresch site and encompasses 2 acres.

The Minnesota Pollution Control Agency (MPCA) investigated the three properties in 1980. Analysis of waste samples indicated that a variety of hazardous substances, particularly volatile organic compounds (VOCs), had been disposed in trenches at the Abresch and Brockman sites. Soil sampling at the Eberle site revealed a small amount of heavy metal contaminants.

The U.S. Environmental Protection Agency (EPA) placed the Oakdale Dump site on the Superfund National Priorities List on September 8, 1983.

== Threats and contaminants ==
A variety of hazardous substances, including VOCs such as isopropyl ether (IPE) and benzene, were disposed at the three sites. Soil sampling at the Eberle site revealed minimal heavy metals contamination. Analysis of residential well water revealed that nine shallow wells were contaminated with hazardous substances.

In 2007 3M signed an agreement with the MPCA to address perfluorinated compound (PFC) contamination, since PFCs are not listed as hazardous substances by Superfund law the EPA was not a signatory.

== Cleanup progress ==
In September 1982, the Minnesota Mining and Manufacturing Company (3M) conducted excavation tests in the trenches at the Abresch site and buried drum stockpiles were identified. 3M commissioned a surface cleanup of wastes at the Abresch site beginning in the winter of 1983. During the excavation activities, a total of 11,500 cubic yards of waste material was removed including 4,200 empty drums, 8,700 empty 5-gallon pails, 4,660 cubic yards of contaminated soil, and 15 intact containers that were over-packed. Most of the waste, 11,800 tons, was transported to the 3M Chemolite incinerator in Cottage Grove, Minnesota. An additional 6,500 tons of excavated waste containing more than 50 parts per million (ppm) of polychlorinated biphenyls (PCBs) were transported to a hazardous waste landfill for disposal. Excavated soils with low levels of contamination were treated on-site utilizing construction aeration pads. Approximately 173,000 gallons of contaminated water was collected during excavation activities and transported for treatment at the 3M Chemolite facility.

Abandonment of multi-aquifer wells was completed in 1984. There had previously been 44 multi-aquifer wells identified within the groundwater plume. Of these 44 wells, 39 were abandoned, 3 were added to the monitoring well network, and 2 were found to be single aquifer wells completed within an unaffected aquifer. Wells were abandoned in accordance with the Minnesota Department of Health Water Well Construction Code.

EPA completed the first five-year review at the site in March 1993 and MPCA completed the second five-year review in March 1998. The third five-year review, completed by EPA in April 2004, found that the groundwater remedy was removing VOCs from the glacial drift and was controlling plume migration. In 2009, MPCA completed the fourth five-year review which found that the remedy is functioning as intended and is protective of human health and the environment in the short term. Long-term protectiveness will be ensured once institutional controls are in place.

== Property reuse ==
The 2-acre Eberle site has since been redeveloped as a city park, the 5-acre Brockman site has been partially redeveloped for commercial use while the most heavily polluted property, the 55-acre Abresch site is still undeveloped and undergoing cleanup.

== See also ==
- List of Superfund sites in Minnesota
- Timeline of events related to per- and polyfluoroalkyl substances
