= Nexcare =

Personal health care brand

- Current owner: 3M
- Country: United States
- Introduced: 1994
- Website: www.nexcare.com

Nexcare is 3M's personal health care brand. The brand produces adhesive bandages and first aid products. The brand also sells similar products such as bandages, gauze, surgical tape, cold sore treatment and liquid bandage products.

The brand has used a mascot called "Nexcare Nana", an elderly stunt woman, to demonstrate the durability of the products. Since 2017, they have been an official supplier of USA Swimming. In 2018, as part of an ad campaign for the brand called "Tough Love" intended to prompt parents not to be over-cautious about their children's play, 3M signed American Ninja Warrior contestant Jessie Graff as a spokeswoman. The brand is also a sponsor of the American Red Cross's observation of World Donor Day to encourage blood donation.

== See also ==
- Elastoplast
- Curad
