= Band-Aid =

Brand of adhesive bandages

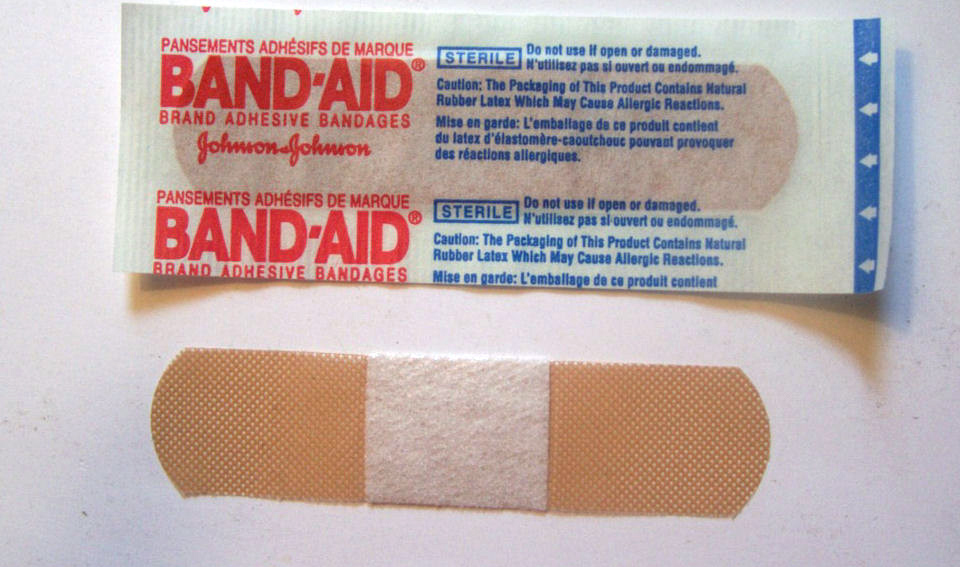
- Product type: Adhesive bandage/dressing
- Current owner: Kenvue
- Country: United States
- Introduced: June 1920; 106 years ago
- Markets: Worldwide
- Tagline: "I am stuck on Band-Aid brand 'cause Band-Aid's stuck on me!" (US); "Stays on until you want it off" (Aus)
- Website: band-aid.com

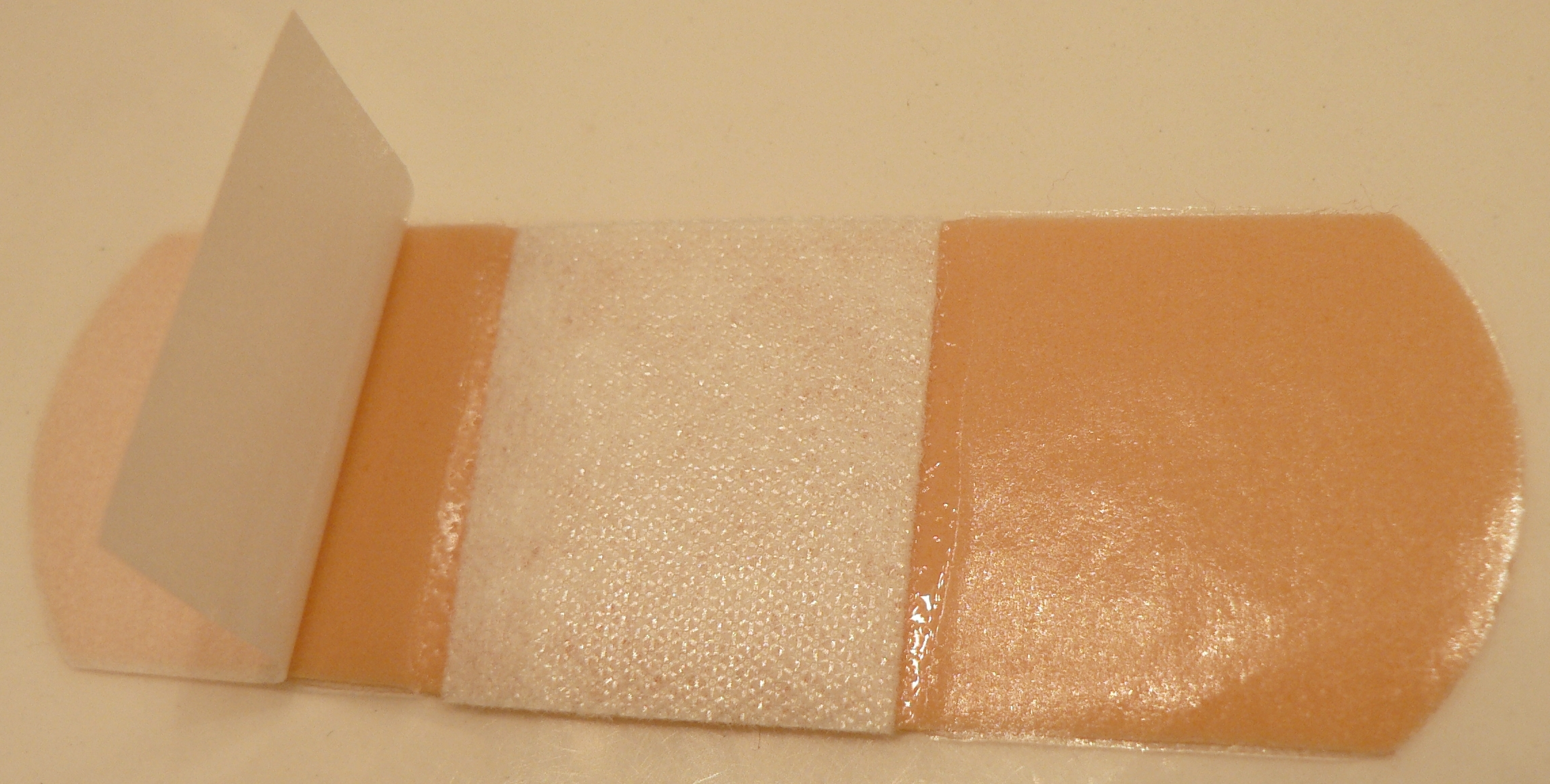
A close-up of an open Band-Aid

Band-Aid is a brand of adhesive bandages distributed by the consumer health company Kenvue, spun off from Johnson & Johnson in 2023. Invented in 1920, the brand has become a generic term for adhesive bandages in countries such as the United States, Canada, Australia, and others.

== History ==
The Band-Aid was invented in 1920 by a Johnson & Johnson employee, Earle Dickson, in Highland Park, New Jersey, for his wife Josephine, who frequently injured, cut and burned herself while cooking. The prototype was a strip of gauze down the middle of a long piece of surgical tape that allowed her to dress her wounds without assistance. Dickson passed the idea on to his employer, which went on to produce and market the product as the Band-Aid. Dickson had a successful career at Johnson & Johnson, rising to vice president until his retirement in 1957. He remained on the board of directors until his death in 1961.

The original Band-Aids were handmade at 18 inches long and 2.5 inches wide, which proved to be very unpopular. In 1921, the product made just $3,000. To help improve sales, Johnson & Johnson distributed free Band-Aids to the Boy Scouts of America. By 1924, Johnson & Johnson introduced machine-made Band-Aids and began the sale of sterilized Band-Aids in 1939. A red pull string was added in 1940 to help open the packaging. It remained until 1992, when it was replaced by a new tear-apart design.

During World War II, millions were shipped internationally, helping popularize the product. Since then, Johnson & Johnson has estimated a sale of over 100 billion Band-Aids worldwide.

In 1956, the first decorative Band-Aids were introduced, featuring its Stars ‘n Strips design. Vinyl tape was introduced in 1958. They continue to be a commercial success, with such themes as Nickelodeon characters, Mickey Mouse, Donald Duck, Superman, Spider-Man, smiley faces, Barbie, Elmo (Sesame Street), Batman and other.

Johnson & Johnson introduced its famous "I am stuck on BAND-AID Brand ’cuz BAND-AID’s stuck on me" jingle in 1975. The jingle was written by Barry Manilow.

In 2022, Band-Aid was named the most trusted brand in the United States, beating the second place brand, Lysol, by more than two points.

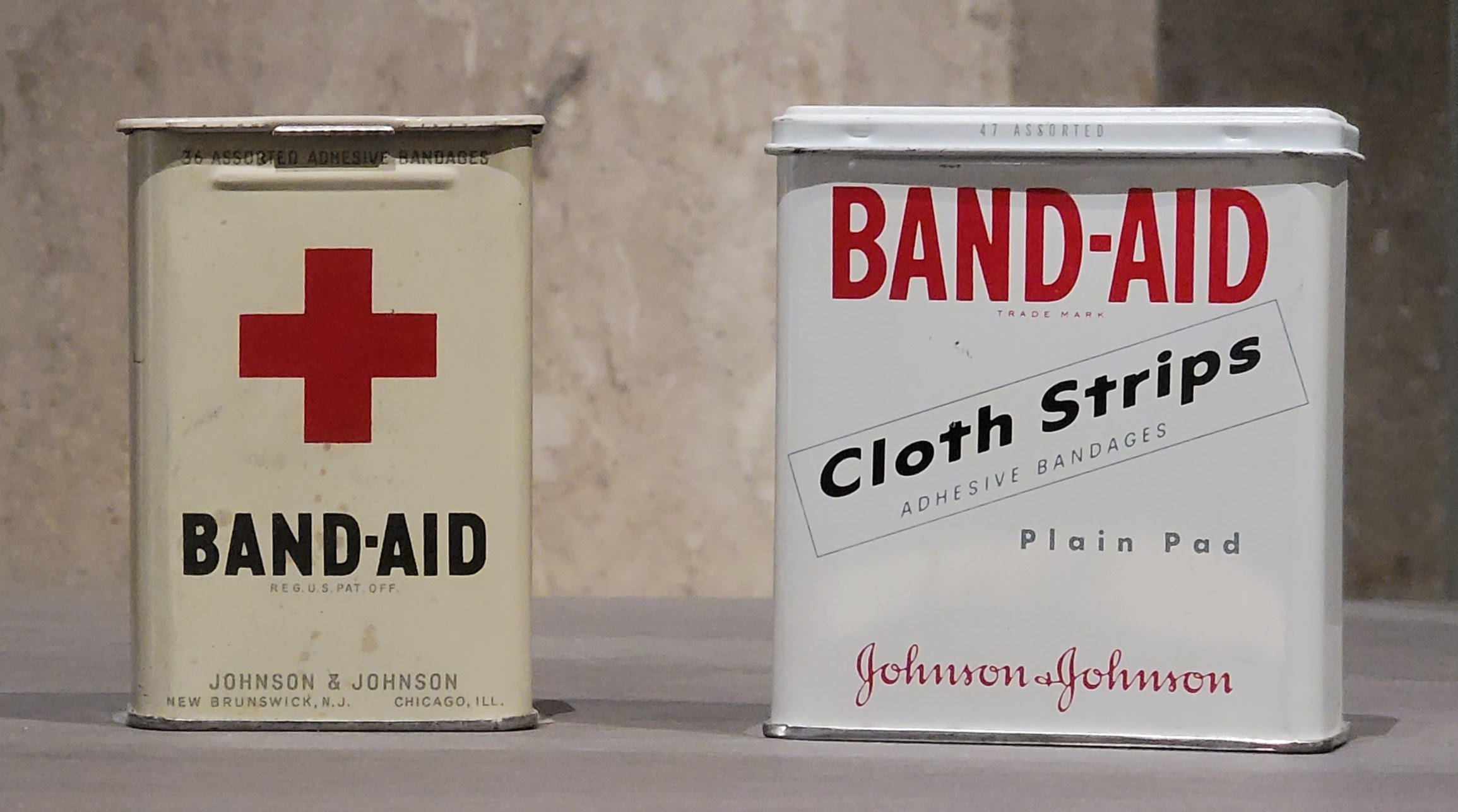
Band-Aid tins (1942, 1958)

== Trademark status ==
Over time, Band-Aid has become a well-known example of a genericized trademark in the United States, Canada and South America. Johnson & Johnson has registered Band-Aid as a trademark on the Principal Register of the United States Patent and Trademark Office and has tried to prevent its genericization in its marketing.

== See also ==
- Elastoplast, a comparable European brand and genericized trademark
