= Jerome J. Belisle =

American businessman and politician (1932–2020)

Jerome J. Belisle (August 4, 1932 – April 22, 2020) was an American businessman and politician.

Belisle was born on a farm in Balsam Lake, Polk County, Wisconsin. He graduated from Balsam Lake High School and then served in the United States Army from 1952 to 1954 and was with the military police. He lived in Saint Paul, Minnesota with his wife and family and worked in advertising for 3M. Belisle served in the Minnesota House of Representatives in 1973 and 1974. He also lived in Oakdale, Washington County, Minnesota, and served on the Oakdale City and Town Council.
