= 2018 California Proposition 69 =

Proposition 69
- Transportation Taxes and Fees Lockbox and Appropriations Limit Exemption Amendment

Results
Choice	Votes	%
Yes	5,386,972	81.01%
No	1,262,455	18.99%
- County results Yes 80–90% 70–80%

California Proposition 69 was a legislatively referred constitutional amendment that appeared on ballots in California in the June primary election in 2018. This measure put the revenue from the Road Repair and Accountability Act, which increased fuel taxes, in a "lockbox" so that it can only be used for transportation-related purposes. It also exempts said gas tax revenue from the previously existing appropriations mandate and expenditures limit. This state constitution amendment ensures that revenues from SB1 Gas Taxes established by the Road Repair and Accountability Act of 2017 can only be used for transportation-related purposes.

== Vote results ==
Proposition 69
- Transportation Taxes and Fees Lockbox and Appropriations Limit Exemption Amendment

Results
Choice	Votes	%
Yes	5,386,972	81.01%
No	1,262,455	18.99%
Valid votes	6,649,427	100.00%
Invalid or blank votes	0	0.00%
Total votes	6,649,427	100.00%
Registered voters/turnout	6,649,427	100%

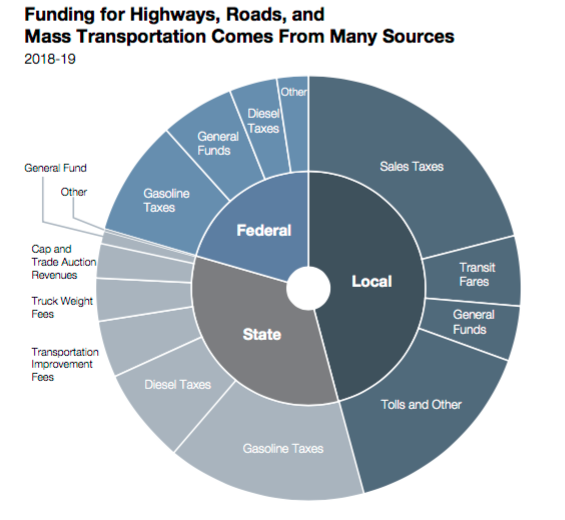
Sources of Funding for California Infrastructure

In the June 2018 primary election, voters approved locking the California SB1 gas tax increase to transportation only. The ballot passed with 5,386,972 votes at 81.0% of the polls. The SB1 mandate does not allow any additional lanes or roads built other than car pool, bus, bicycle lane conversion and increased funding for other public transportation such as bus and trains. The SB1 Car Fee increase and all older existing Gas Tax before SB1 still appropriated to the General Fund for any project. Proposition 69 mandated SB1's tax increase and fee schedules exempt from the state appropriations spending limit.

=== Yes/no statement ===
A "yes" vote on Proposition 69 proposes: the California Legislature will be required to continue to spend revenues from recently enacted fuel taxes and vehicle fees for spending on infrastructure, including repairing roads and improving transit. A "no" vote on Proposition 69 proposes: The California Legislature could change current law in the future, allowing it to spend a portion of the revenues from recently enacted fuel taxes and vehicle fees on purposes other than transportation.

==== Support ====
Proponents point out that Proposition 69 won't raise taxes while forcing lawmakers to take on necessary road and mass transit projects. California governors and legislators, including Governor Arnold Schwarzenegger, have raided transportation funds to balance the state budget. Senator Josh Newman (Democrat- District 29), one of the amendment's authors, said it was essential that the new gas tax revenues will be spent "only on repairing our aging infrastructure, reducing congestion, and otherwise supporting transportation improvements that foster economic development across the state." Of the 51,000 miles of California highways in 2017, 53% were in fair condition and 6% were in poor condition. Supporters highlight that Proposition 69 can maximize the social welfare function for every community in the state, and guarantee that taxes go to valuable transportation projects.

==== Opposition ====
Californians against Proposition 69 argue that the measure doesn't go far enough to protect other transportation fees, such as the vehicle weight fee. California Republicans propelled the "No on Prop 69" movement. California senator John Moorlach (Republican - 37th Senate District) and Assemblyman Frank Bigelow (Republican - 5th Assembly District) justified their opposition: "state spending will continue to spiral out of control, and it fails to fully protect transportation taxes from being diverted to programs that do nothing to fix our roads and highways."Andrea Seastrand, president of the Central Coast Taxpayers Association, stated:

"While this may sound assuring even to those who opposed raising the gas tax, the reality is that this ballot measure is all about creating a false sense of security for taxpayers. The gas tax increase was incredibly unpopular with voters who already felt the burden of some of the highest fuel costs in the nation. In order to help justify the tax hikes, Proposition 69 was conceived as a companion measure to make the public think that they could trust Sacramento this time and transportation funds would only go to their intended purposes."

Opposers contend that the proposition does not go far enough, and fails to fully protect transportation taxes from being diverted to programs that have nothing to do with fixing roads and highways. State lockboxes tend to only be for transportation, but education proponents often oppose them, citing them "as a ceiling rather than a floor" for education spending.

== Fiscal impact statement ==
Upon passage of Proposition 69, there would be no direct effect on the amount of state or local revenues, as the initiative does not alter existing tax and fee rates. The measure "could affect how monies are spent," since it ensures that existing revenues will be spent solely on transportation purposes. Finally, the initiative would put California slightly below its constitutional spending limit, since less than one-tenth of spending from the new SB1 revenues would count toward the limit.

== Economic impact ==
=== Traffic congestion ===
Empirical evidence has displayed that the provision of extra road capacity results in a greater congestion of traffic. An average road improvement has induced an additional 10% of base traffic in the short term and 20% in the long term. Increased traffic occurs on the alternative routes that road improvements are intended to relieve. However, other evidence has shown that in California, there is no conclusive evidence that increases in state highway lane-miles have affected traffic on other roads.

=== Other states with lockbox amendments ===
Alaska is the only state to not have statutory or constitutional restrictions on transportation revenue diversion. Since 2010, Maryland, Wisconsin, New Jersey, Illinois, and Louisiana voters have all amended their constitutions through ballot measures to enable transportation lockboxes. Twenty-one states dedicate revenues to transportation broadly (such as Rhode Island, Nebraska, and Florida), while twenty-seven restrict revenues only to highways (such as Arizona, Iowa, and Maine). Yet, such amendments also come with risk. While lockboxes ensure that transportation revenues won't get suddenly get cut, they tie transportation to fuel taxes, which inflated or increased fuel economy can erode.

=== Demand effect ===
Claims that road investments spur new travel, known as induced demand, and thus fail to relieve traffic congestion have thwarted road development in the United States. In California, road investments not only stimulated travel demand but respond to it as well. Induced demand effects build over time, as more roads are improved. Furthermore, there are strong reciprocal relationships between road investment and travel demand in California. There is no simple quick fix to achieve road demand reduction, especially in a growing state like California.
