= Michael F. Roman =

American executive

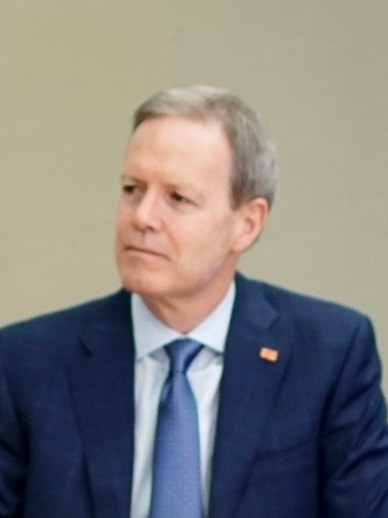
- Born: 1959 or 1960 (age 66–67)
- Education: University of Wisconsin–Stevens Point; University of Minnesota; University of Southern California
- Occupation: Chairman of 3M
- Employer: 3M
- Board member of: 3M; University of Minnesota Foundation

Michael F. Roman is an American executive who was the Chief Executive Officer (CEO) of 3M. Prior to being named CEO in 2018, was chief strategy officer and chief operating officer, among other positions since joining the company in 1988. Roman also is on the board of trustees of the University of Minnesota Foundation. He is a member of the President's Export Council.

== Early life and education ==
Roman was born to an insurance salesman and a hospice worker. He was raised in Stevens Point, Wisconsin as the oldest of five siblings.

Roman attended the University of Wisconsin–Stevens Point during 1978–1980 and played on the Pointers football team. He received his bachelor's degree from the University of Minnesota's Department of Electrical and Computer Engineering in 1982, followed by a master's degree in electrical engineering from the University of Southern California in 1987.

== Career ==
Early in his career, Roman worked for the Hughes Aircraft Company. He has been employed by 3M for more than 35 years, joining as a senior design engineer in 1988. Since then, Roman has held a variety of positions, working for the company in the United States, Europe, and Asia. He oversaw operations in Europe, the Middle East, and Africa while living in Brussels. He also led 3M Korea and was chief strategy officer (CSO) for approximately ten years. Roman led the industrial business group, 3M's largest division at the time, during 2014–2017. He became chief operating officer (COO) and executive vice president on July 1, 2017; during his tenure, he managed international operations as well as 3M's five business divisions. Roman began as chief executive officer (CEO) in July 2018, and became chairman in mid-2019. He earned $12.9 million and $18.3 million in 2018 and 2019, respectively.

Roman ranked number 45 in Glassdoor's 2019 list of the top 100 "most popular" CEOs of large companies, earning a 95 percent rating. In 2020, he and U.S. President Donald Trump publicly disagreed over 3M's handling of face mask distribution during the COVID-19 pandemic. Roman received an Eisenhower Award from Business Executives for National Security in 2020.

In addition to being chairman of 3M's board of directors, Roman currently is treasurer on the University of Minnesota Foundation's board of trustees. He is also a member of the Minnesota Business Partnership (MBP). In mid-2020, he was among approximately 80 MBP members who signed a letter to legislators encouraging them "to adopt policing reforms that address police misconduct and increase accountability and transparency", derived from recommendations made by the State of Minnesota Working Group on Police-Involved Deadly Force Encounters.

Roman spoke at a graduation ceremony at the University of Wisconsin–Stevens Point in 2018. He has been a long-term supporter of Big Brothers Big Sisters of America.

In 2024 Roman retired and chose William Brown as his successor, effective May 1, 2024. He was concurrently appointed to the 3M Board of Directors.

== See also ==
- List of University of Minnesota people
- List of University of Southern California people
