= Nick Kochan =

Financial and political journalist

Nick Kochan is a financial and political journalist based in London. He has written extensively on financial and white collar crime. He writes for UK newspapers and international magazines, and has written and co-written books. Kochan is also a lecturer and conference speaker on financial crime and politics.

== Early life and education ==
Kochan was educated at Magdalen College School in Oxford, and at Fitzwilliam College, Cambridge, graduating in Classics and English in 1976.

== Published works ==
- 2011, October: Corruption: The New Corporate Challenge, (with Robin Goodyear) Published by Palgrave-Macmillan
- 2008, November: What Happened, and other questions everyone is asking about the Credit Crunch (with Hugh Pym), Published by Old Street Publishing
- 2006, December: The Middle East markets: The new opportunities, Published by Thomson Financial
- 2006, August: The Washing Machine, paperback edition, with additional chapter on David Mills and Berlusconi, Published by Duckworth
- 2005: The Washing Machine: how money laundering and terrorist financing soils us, Published by Thomson-Texere Publishing
- 2000: Ann Widdecombe: Right from the beginning, Published by Politico's Publishing
- 1998: Gordon Brown: the first year in power (with Hugh Pym), Published by Bloomsbury
- 1996: The World’s Greatest Brands, edited by Nicholas Kochan, Published by Macmillan
- 1994: Biography of Sir David Alliance, privately commissioned by the subject
- 1992: Hanson. A biography. Serialised by the Sunday Business newspaper. Commissioned Hamish Hamilton, [Never published for legal reasons]
- 1991: Bankrupt, The BCCI fraud, Published by Victor Gollancz (with Bob Whittington)
- 1991: New Directions in Corporate Governance, Published by the Economist Intelligence Unit
- 1987: The Guinness Affair, anatomy of the scandal, published by Christopher Helm (with Hugh Pym)

== Freelance newspaper and magazine journalism ==
Kochan has published numerous articles in:

- The Observer
- The Economist
- The Times
- The Sunday Times
- The Sunday Telegraph
- The Guardian
- New Statesman
- Euromoney Magazine
- The Director
- Offshore Financial Review

Kochan is also a Contributing Editor to Euromoney Magazine and contributing editor to The Banker.

== Radio and television journalism ==
Kochan regularly appears on BBC Radio and TV and Sky as an expert on money laundering, economics, finance, politics and terrorist finance.

Kochan interviewed 12 British businessmen for two series of six programmes about entrepreneurs for BBC Radio Four. He also conducted six radio interviews with Jewish writers for another BBC Radio Four series.

In 1990, Kochan researched a Despatches programme for Channel Four about the Guinness affair.
