= Arrowhead Refinery Company =

Former oil recycling facility in Minnesota

Coordinates: 46°50′20″N 92°14′30″W

The Arrowhead Refinery Superfund site is a 10-acre former waste oil recycling facility, located in Hermantown, Minnesota, within a white cedar wetland. The refining process generated a waste stream of highly acidic, metal-laden sludge which was disposed of in an unlined two-acre lagoon on the site and waste process water which was discharged into a wastewater ditch in a wetland area. Arrowhead Refining Company incorporated in 1961 and continued the re-refining activities until 1977. A public health risk assessment stated that if no action was taken to remedy the site, use or development of the site would result in unacceptable health effects on user populations. It was also determined that there was a future potential exposure risk for offsite drinking water wells across the road from the site and in the pathway of the contaminated groundwater plume. The record of decision (ROD) was issued in September 1986. In 2025 it was announced that the City of Hermantown was awarded a $2 million grant from the Minnesota Department of Employment and Economic Development to build a 35-acre industrial park on this remediated site.

== Threats and contaminants ==
Site investigations that began in May 1984 found volatile organic compounds (VOCs), polynuclear aromatic hydrocarbons (PNAs), carcinogenic PNAs, petroleum hydrocarbons, and metals in the source material, soils, and sediments. In addition, the pH of the sludge was found to be between one and two.

== Cleanup progress ==
The site has been fully remediated. In 1990, 13 residents were taken off of their well water and placed on municipal water. Between 1991 and 1993, a groundwater extraction system was constructed onsite, which created a hydraulic barrier around the site, so that no off-site migration would occur. The original ROD also called for on-site incineration of soils and sludge materials. However, the ROD was amended in 1994 to the following:

The excavation and treatment of sludge was conducted in 1995 and 1996 and is complete. The excavation and off-site disposal of soils and sediments was conducted in 1996 and is complete. There has been an ongoing long-term remedial action with respect to the groundwater extraction system. The groundwater extraction system has been shut down because it appears that the groundwater cleanup goals have been met.

A five-year review report was submitted in September 1997, which showed that contaminant levels in the underlying aquifer had dropped steadily. The system will continue to operate until cleanup objectives are fully met. A second five-year review report was issued in September 2002. The five-year review concluded that the source material phase, the groundwater phase, and the soil and sediment phase are currently protective of human health and the environment. A final protectiveness statement cannot be made for the soil and sediment phase until further information is obtained, regarding potential impacts to aquatic organisms in the site ditch, soil settlement issues and a plugged culvert, and finalization of restrictive covenants.

A third five-year review completed in September 2007 determined that all of the issues from the second five-year review were addressed with the exception of the finalization of the property restrictive covenants. Restrictive covenants are one of several legal or administrative controls which help to minimize exposure to contaminants and are generally referred to as institutional controls. The third five-year review determined that the remedy is expected to be or is protective of human health and the environment, and in the interim, exposure pathways that could result in unacceptable risks are being controlled. However, in order for the remedy to be protective in the long-term, some further actions need to be taken, including more robust institutional controls to ensure the remedy is not disturbed in the future. A trial shut-down of the groundwater extraction system has been started by the Minnesota Pollution Control Agency (MPCA) and ground water monitoring will be performed for several more years to verify that groundwater cleanup goals have been achieved. Groundwater will also be monitored to determine if surface water is being impacted by the site. The MPCA and the EPA are in the process of implementing more institutional controls that will achieve long-term protectiveness at the site.

A fourth five-year was completed in August 2012. The review concluded that the site was protective of human health and the environment in the short term, and that to ensure the site is protective of human health and the environment in the long term, more robust institutional controls, such as restrictive covenants, should be placed on the site. The MPCA and the EPA are in the process of implementing these institutional controls, and will soon begin the process to delist the site from the National Priorities List.

== Property reuse ==
The property has been purchased by a developer who is interested in using the property for commercial use.
