= Adhesive bandage =

Small self-adhesive medical dressing

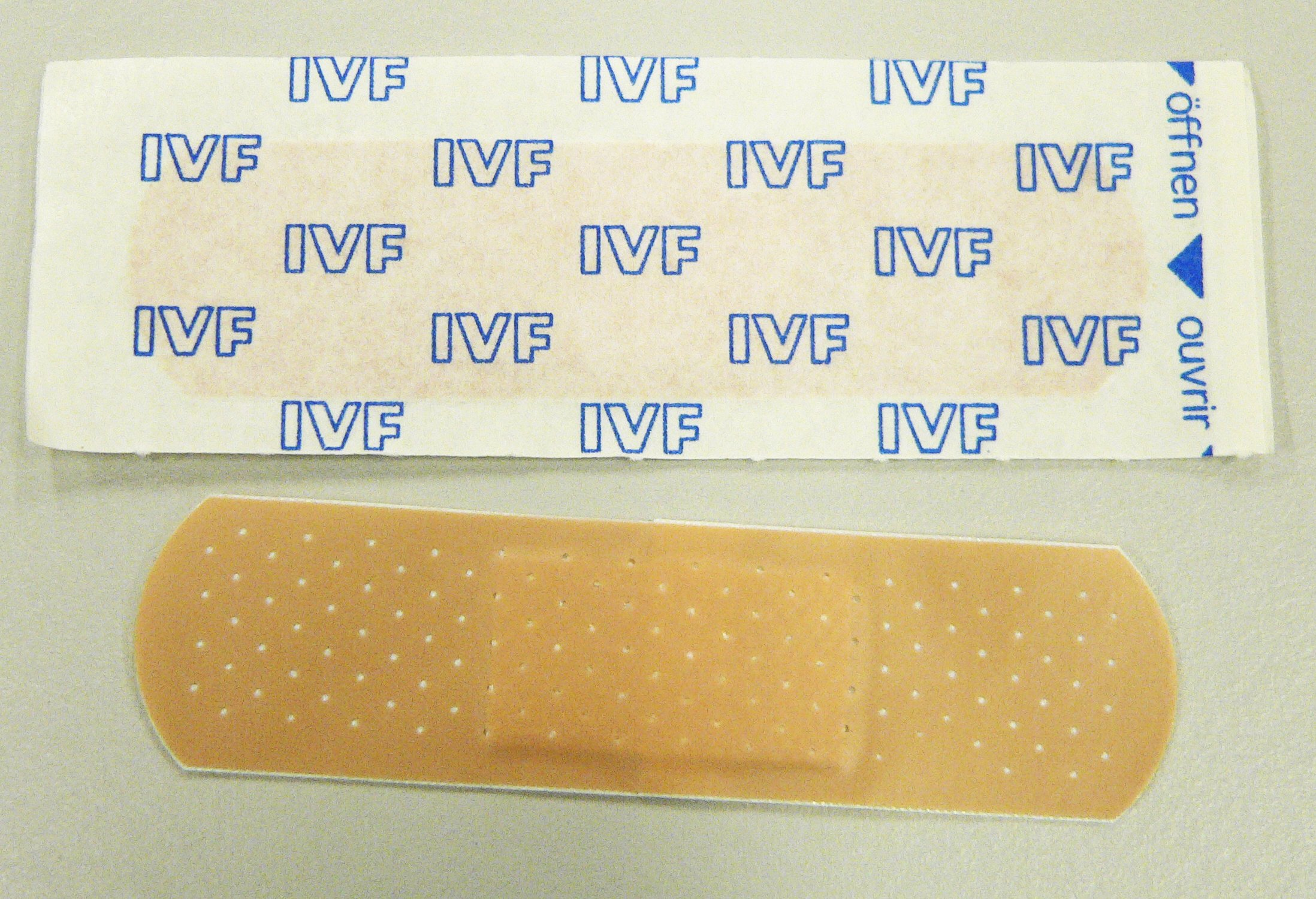
Typical adhesive bandage

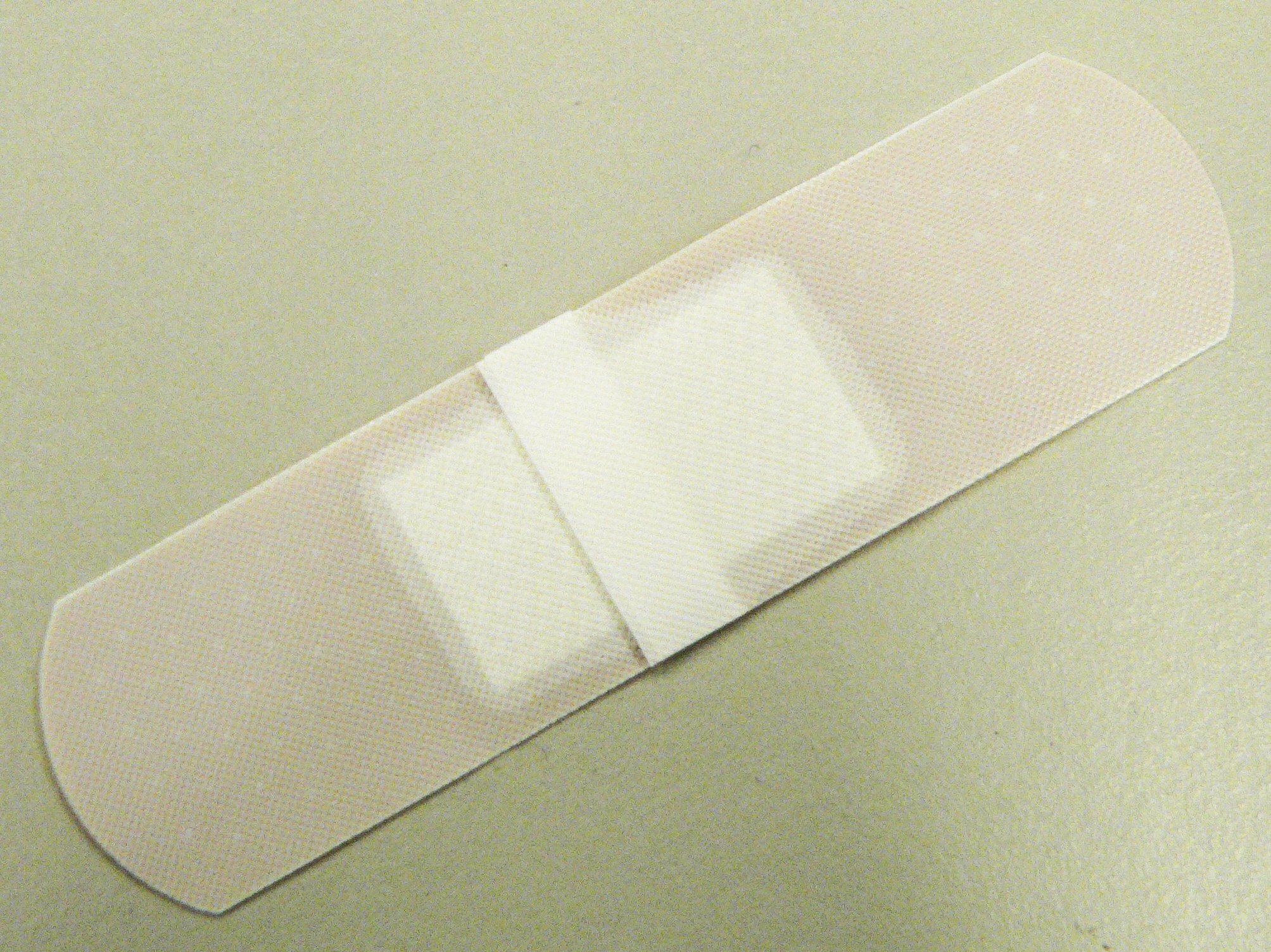
Reverse of an adhesive bandage, showing backing

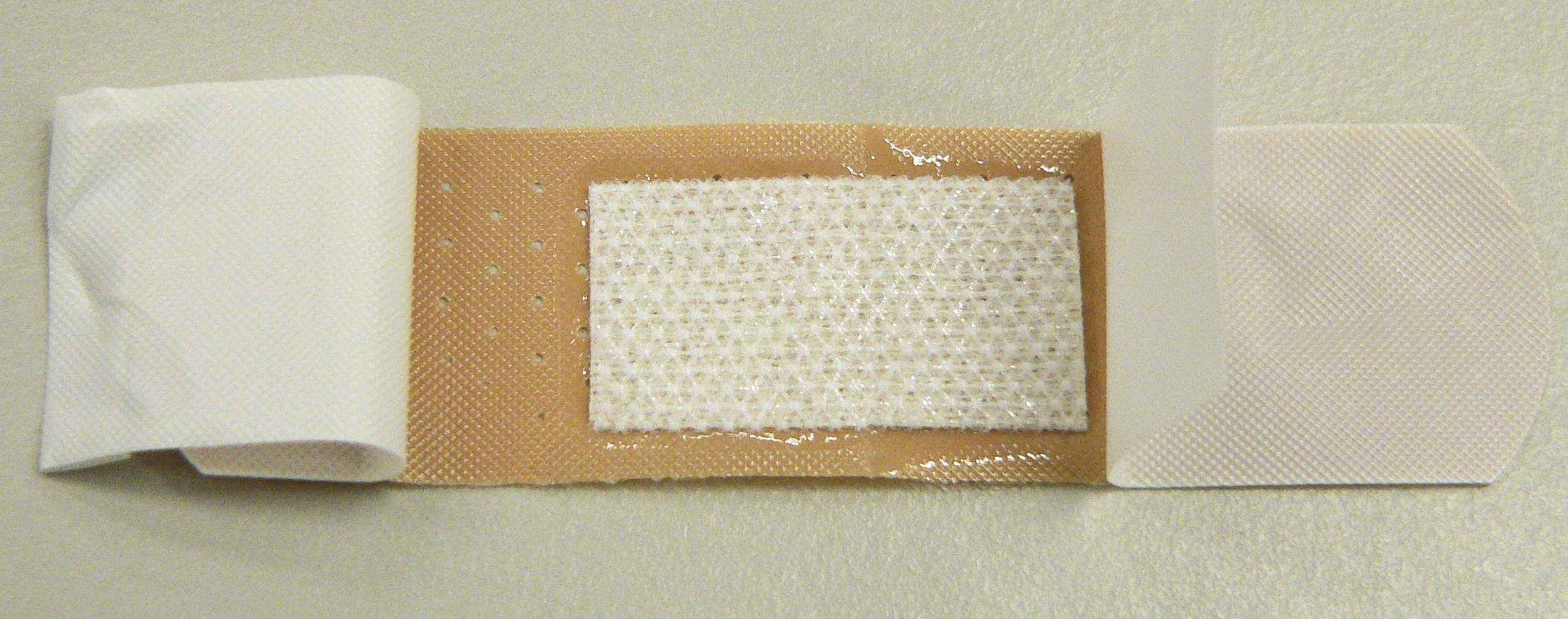
Opened adhesive bandage, showing the non-adhesive absorbent pad, adhesive area (colored) and backing (peeled back)

An adhesive bandage, also called a sticking plaster, sticky plaster, medical plaster, or simply plaster in British English, is a small medical dressing used for injuries not serious enough to require a full-size bandage. They are also known by the genericized trademarks of Band-Aid (as "band-aid" or "band aid" in Australia, Canada, India and the US) or Elastoplast (in the UK).

== Function ==
The adhesive bandage protects the wound and scab from friction, bacteria, damage, and dirt. Thus, the healing process of the body is less disturbed. Some of the dressings have antiseptic properties. An additional function is to hold the two cut edges of the skin together to make the healing process faster.

== Design ==
An adhesive bandage is a small, flexible sheet of material which is sticky on one side, with a smaller, non-sticky, absorbent pad stuck to the sticky side. The pad is placed against the wound, and overlapping edges of the sticky material are smoothed down so they stick to the surrounding skin. Adhesive bandages are generally packaged in a sealed, sterile bag, with a backing covering the sticky side; the backing is removed as the bandage is applied. They come in a variety of sizes and shapes.

== Materials ==
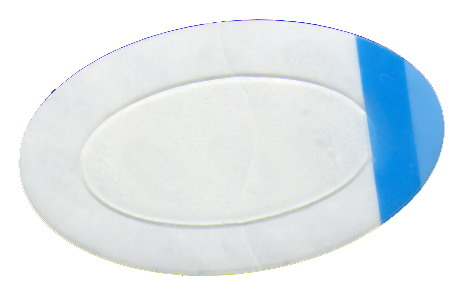
A hydrogel dressing. An entirely transparent adhesive bandage, with a transparent hydrogel pad and adhesive waterproof plastic film (removable backing is blue and white).

The backing and bag are often made of coated paper, but may be made of plastic.

The adhesive sheet is usually a woven fabric, plastic (PVC, polyethylene or polyurethane), or latex strip. It may or may not be waterproof; if it is airtight, the bandage is an occlusive dressing. The adhesive is commonly an acrylate, including methacrylates and epoxy diacrylates (which are also known as vinyl resins).

Some people have allergies to some of these materials, particularly latex and some adhesives.

== Colors ==
Due to being widely available only in a standard color, some people with skin tones darker than the standard bandage color have expressed frustration at having to use bandages that looked less conspicuous on the skin of lighter-skinned people. This has led to greater support for pharmaceutical companies that manufacture these bandages in a variety of skin tones.

Some bandages, especially those designed for children, may come in a wide variety of colors or may feature cartoon characters.

Special bandages are used by food preparation workers. These are waterproof, have strong adhesive so they are less likely to fall off, and are usually blue so that they are more clearly visible in food. Some include a metal strip detectable by machines used in food manufacturing to ensure that food is free from foreign objects.

== Variants ==
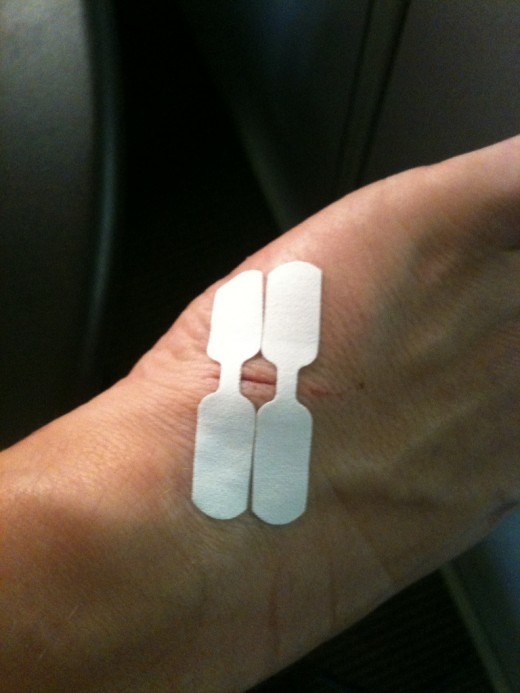
A wound held closed with butterfly closures

Transdermal patches are adhesive bandages with the function to distribute medication through the skin, rather than protecting a wound.

Butterfly closures, also known as butterfly stitches, are generally thin adhesive strips which can be used to close small wounds. They are applied perpendicular to the laceration in a manner which pulls the skin on either side of the wound together. They are not true sutures, but can often be used in addition to, or in place of actual sutures for small wounds. Butterfly stitches can be advantageous in that they do not need a medical professional to be placed or removed, and are thus a common item in first aid kits.

== Notable brands ==
- Band-Aid
- Curad
- Elastoplast
- Nexcare

== See also ==
- Dressing (medical)
- Wound closure strips
