= Herbert P. Buetow =

American businessman

Herbert P. Buetow (1898 – January 8, 1972) was an American businessman. He was born in St. Paul, Minnesota. He received a B.A. from the University of Minnesota in 1921. He was married to Luella Witt Buetow and had one daughter Janet Buetow Smith.

== Career ==
In a career spanning over 42 years at 3M, Buetow served as an auditor, controller, treasurer, director, executive vice president, president and chairman of the finance committee. He was the company's sixth president serving from 1953 to 1963. While president, 3M's annual sales and employment roughly tripled, the company became an international operation and the company was often cited as one of the best managed companies in the United States.

Buetow was also an active participant in employee recreational programs, playing on the company bowling team, golf team and once managed the baseball team. He even once wrote a humor column for the employee publication during his first years with 3M. In May 1968 his many contributions to 3M's growth and success were recognized in a tribute from the Board of Directors during the annual meeting when he retired as director and chairman of the finance committee.

== Awards ==
Throughout his life Buetow kept active in the business, social and civic affairs in St. Paul. In 1961 he received the Great Living American award from the U.S. Chamber of Commerce. Buetow was also the president of the St. Paul Chamber of Commerce in 1964 and he served on a long list of committees and boards including the Community Chest, Ramsey County Tuberculosis and Health Association and Junior Achievement. From 1936 to 1938 he served as the founding president of the Twin Cities Chapter of the Controllers Institute of America (currently known as Financial Executives International). Buetow was a director of both the First Trust Company of St. Paul and the First National Bank of St. Paul and for seven years was the president of the First Merchants Bank of St. Paul. Buetow was also active in the St. Paul Winter Carnival.
