= American Road and Transportation Builders Association =

American trade association

American Road & Transportation Builders Association
- Type: Trade Association
- Industry: Transportation
- Founded: 1902
- Founder: Horatio Earle
- Headquarters: Washington, D.C., United States
- Area served: United States
- Key people: Dave Bauer (President & CEO); Matt Jeanneret (Executive Vice President & COO); Steve McGough, (2019–2020 Chairman) Ward Nye, (2019–2020 Senior Vice Chairman)
- Website: www.artba.org

The American Road & Transportation Builders Association (ARTBA) is a trade association representing the transportation construction industry in the United States and is based in Washington, D.C., United States.

Established in 1902, the association has more than 8,000 members from the public and private sectors and advocates for investment in transportation infrastructure. The United States transportation construction industry generates more than $580 billion in annual economic activity and supports more than 4 million American jobs. ARTBA membership divisions include contractors, planning and design, transportation officials, traffic safety, materials and services, public-private partnerships, research and education, and equipment manufacturers. ARTBA's members have knowledge and experience in building the road, rail, air, port, and waterway facilities of the United States.

== Function ==
ARTBA is a federation whose primary goal is to bring together all facets of the transportation construction industry to responsibly advocate for infrastructure investment and policy that meet the nation’s need for safe and efficient travel.

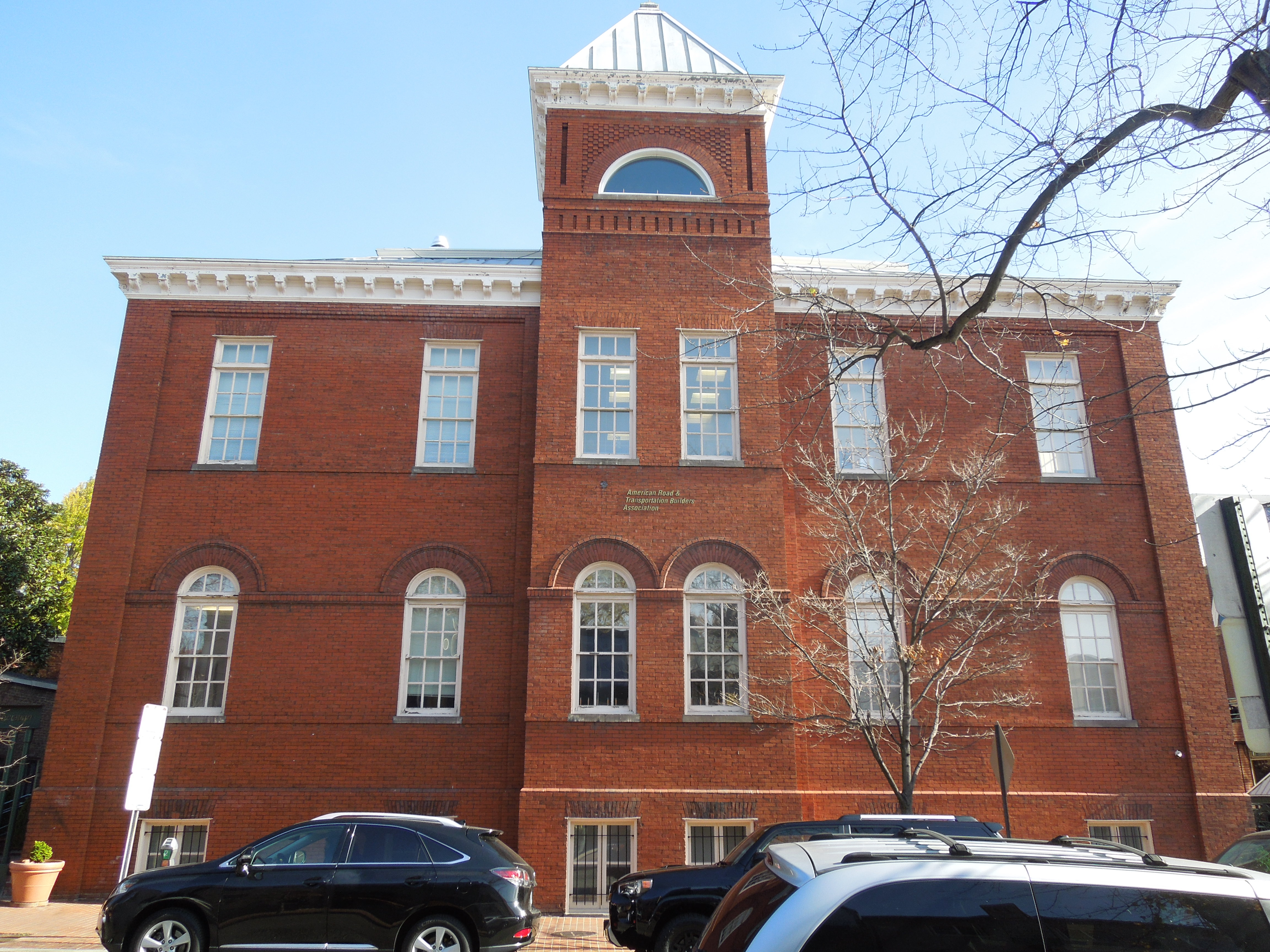
ARTBA headquarters in Washington, D.C.

== Legal and regulatory advocacy ==
ARTBA defends transportation construction industry market interests from regulation or litigation. ARTBA's legal advocacy has allowed nearly $52 billion in approved, yet challenged, U.S. transportation projects and plans to move forward. In 2009, the association expanded its market protection activities for the future with the creation of the Transportation Development Legal Advocacy & Education Center.

ARTBA also actively represents the industry's views before federal regulatory agencies, regularly submitting comments on issues like clean air and water, wetlands, stormwater, greenhouse gas emissions and work zone safety.

== Economics and research ==
The ARTBA Economics and Research team develops reports, analyses, and other products.

ARTBA's subscription-based intelligence reports provide monthly and quarterly information covering the transportation design and construction market. The association also produces other studies and reports, which are available to its members and news journalists, on industry employment, the cost of construction materials, state gasoline taxes, an annual highway construction market forecast and much more.

== Coalitions ==
ARTBA has been serving as founder, co-chair and managing day-to-day activities of the Transportation Construction Coalition, and vice chair of the U.S. Chamber of Commerce-led Americans for Transportation Mobility. ARTBA also works with the Better Roads & Transportation Council of America, Small Business Legislative Council and The Road Information Program.

== Transportation Development Foundation ==
In 2015, the ARTBA Transportation Development Foundation (ARTBA-TDF) celebrated 30 years of "promoting research, education and public awareness" on transportation development issues. The Foundation is one of the industry's non-profit organizations, conducting work aimed at advancing the interests of the U.S. transportation design and construction industry. Major ARTBA-TDF initiatives include:

=== Hall of Fame ===
The ARTBA Transportation Development Foundation (ARTBA-TDF) established a Hall of Fame in 2010. The purpose of the Hall of Fame is to "honor individuals or families from the public and private sectors who have made extraordinary contributions to U.S. transportation development over their lifetime and demonstrated exceptional leadership." Inductees include Jim Oberstar, Othmar Ammann, Harry Heltzer and Wallace Hawkes.

=== National Work Zone Safety Information Clearinghouse ===
The Clearinghouse has the world's largest online library of free information on these topics: accident and crash data, latest technologies and equipment, best practices, key safety engineer contact information, laws and regulations, worker safety training materials, research and publications, public education campaigns, Spanish language materials and educational materials for new drivers.

In the fall of 1997, after a competitive bid process, ARTBA was selected as the Clearinghouse project manager. In partnership with the Texas Transportation Institute (TTI), and with financial support from Federal Highway Administration, the facility opened for business on February 17, 1998.

By 2000, Clearinghouse operations were privatized and managed by the ARTBA-Transportation Development Foundation with support from the American Association of State Highway and Transportation Officials, TTI, labor organizations and other safety groups. TTI manages the day-to-day operations, conducts the safety research and maintains the Clearinghouse website. www.workzonesafety.org.

=== Scholarship and awards ===
The ARTBA Foundation endows the Lanford Family Highway Worker Memorial Scholarship fund to provide post-high school financial assistance to the children of highway workers killed or permanently disabled on the job, and features several award competitions to honor industry public relations, environmental protection and safety programs.

=== Safety Training ===
The ARTBA-TDF regularly hosts several national and international forums on roadway and construction zone safety and conducts safety training for thousands of industry workers and managers through several federal government contracts. This includes programs created and run in cooperation with government agencies.

=== Industry Leader Development Program ===
The ARTBA Industry Leader Development Program (ILDP) is focused on developing future leaders of the transportation construction industry in the United States. The annual gathering provides industry "rising stars" an intensive three-day introduction to the legislative and regulatory processes that affect the industry in Washington, and ARTBA's role in shaping public policy.

There have been more than 800 graduates in the program since it was launched in 1995. ILDP fellows have come from more than 200 different companies, public agencies and state contractor organizations in nearly every U.S. state, Washington, D.C., and Canada. Several past participants are currently serving terms on the ARTBA Board of Directors, and many are involved in the ARTBA Industry Leader Development Council (ILDC).

The ILDP curriculum includes seminars on the congressional legislative, budget and appropriations processes. Fellows attend sessions on rulemaking by the federal regulatory agencies and receive an overview of federal environmental, health and safety regulations affecting the industry.

Participants have the opportunity to discuss current federal transportation development issues on Capitol Hill. Each fellow meets with his or her congressman or transportation legislative staff during the ILDP.
