= Freeway Sanitary Landfill =

EPA superfund site in Burnsville, Minnesota

Coordinates: 44°47′42″N 93°17′45″W

The Freeway Sanitary Landfill is a United States Environmental Protection Agency Superfund site that covers 140 acres (57 ha) in Burnsville, Minnesota. In 1971 the Minnesota Pollution Control Agency (MCPA) licensed the landfill to accept 1,920 acre-feet (2,370,000 m^{3}) of household, commercial, demolition, and nonhazardous industrial wastes. The state permit prohibited the disposal of liquids and hazardous wastes; however, heavy metals, acids, and bases were accepted by the landfill from local industries. The landfill also accepted 200 cubic yards (150 m^{3}) of battery casings and 448 short tons (406,000 kg) of aluminum sweat furnace slag. Overall, the landfill contains nearly 5,000,000 cubic yards (3,800,000 m^{3}) of waste. The waste is covered by a low permeability soil cover.

Groundwater contains contaminants which exceed drinking water standards, including volatile organic compounds (VOCs) such as tetrachloroethylene and vinyl chloride, and manganese and thallium. City of Burnsville municipal wells are located about 4,000 feet (1,200 m) to the south of the landfill. These wells serve approximately 36,000 people. Currently the groundwater beneath the Freeway Landfill flows south into the Kraemer Quarry due to long term dewatering of the quarry for mining purposes. When this pumping ceases the ground water flow will be reversed and the contaminated ground water will flow into the Minnesota River approximately 400 feet (120 m) from the landfill.

== Threats and contaminants ==
Groundwater contains contaminants which exceed drinking water standards including VOCs such as tetrachloroethylene and vinyl chloride, and manganese and thallium. Other contaminants exceed surface water criteria. Exposure to contaminated groundwater is possible if the pollutants migrate to the Burnsville municipal well field or discharges into the Minnesota River where wildlife could be harmed. Based on site conditions, the Minnesota Pollution Control Agency (MPCA) has established a groundwater area of concern which extends out from the landfill based on ground measurements.

Landfill gases are also a threat at the site. Two business office buildings are located approximately 60 feet (18 m) and 140 feet (43 m) from the waste footprint. Currently no landfill gas venting system exists at the site. Eight gas monitoring probes exist around the landfill perimeter. Based on the large mass of waste present, no landfill gas venting system, no recent gas monitoring data, and recognizing the potential for gas to migrate under seasonal low permeable (frozen) conditions, the MPCA has established a methane gas area of concern which extends 300 feet (91 m) beyond the waste footprint.

== Cleanup progress ==
The site is being addressed through a long-term cleanup action. In 1986, U.S. EPA began an investigation into the nature and extent of contamination at the site. In 1989, the state became the lead agency for the investigation. The state has issued areas of concern for landfill gases and groundwater. Additional measures are needed concerning the landfill to assure long-term protection of human health and the environment. Currently, pumping related to a nearby quarry operation is acting as an interim groundwater treatment system and is controlling human exposure to groundwater. When this pumping ceases, additional measures will also be needed to assure that human exposure to groundwater remains controlled and to protect the nearby river environment.

== See also ==
- Landfill
- Landfills in the United States
