= Sal Frederick =

American politician (1926–2012)

Member of the Minnesota House of Representatives from the 24B district
- In office January 8, 1985 – January 4, 1993

Personal details
- Born: Marcel Frederick; April 17, 1926 Mankato, Minnesota, U.S.
- Died: September 24, 2012 (aged 86)
- Resting place: Calvary Cemetery, Mankato, Minnesota, U.S.
- Party: Republican
- Spouse: Rose Mary Kelly (m. 1949; died 2003)
- Children: 6
- Occupation: Politician, businessman

Military service
- Allegiance: United States
- Branch/service: United States Army
- Battles/wars: World War II

Marcel "Sal" Frederick (April 17, 1926 – September 24, 2012) was an American businessman and politician.

Frederick was born in Mankato, Minnesota and graduated from Mankato High School in 1944. He served in the United States Army during World War II. Fredrick was one of the founders of the Happy Chef restaurant chain. He served in the Minnesota House of Representatives from 1985 to 1992 and was a Republican. He died in Mankato, Minnesota.
