= Cray House =

Cray House may refer to:

in the United States

- Cray House (Stevensville, Maryland), listed on the NRHP
- Lorin Cray House, Mankato, Minnesota, listed on the NRHP
