= Sibley Park =

Park in Mankato, Minnesota, United States

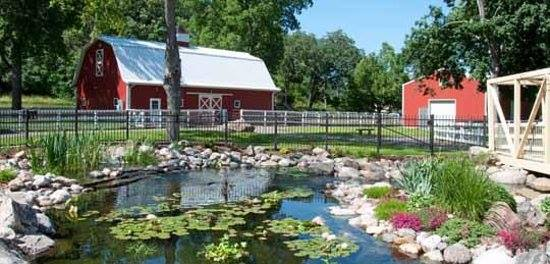
- Sibley Park in the summer
- Interactive map of Sibley Park
- Location: Mankato, Minnesota
- Coordinates: 44°9′40″N 94°2′0″W
- Area: 100 acres (40 ha)
- Established: 1887
- Visitation hours: 6:30am to 10:30pm

Sibley Park is a city park located at the convergence of the Minnesota and Blue Earth Rivers in Mankato, Minnesota, United States.

The park was established in 1887 and was named for the state's first governor Henry Hastings Sibley. The park is split into two sides with a hill separating the two sides. The front side has a band shell, a petting zoo, and large lawn area. There are numerous gardens and walking trails through the park. The river side of the park has a view of the river along with sledding hills during the winter, and softball fields and tennis courts during the summer months. There are also a playground and barbecue pits.

== History ==
Before this site became a park, the large flat hill there was known as the Sibley Mound. Around 1840, Henry Hastings Sibley had camped at the mound and ran a fur trading post nearby. After the U.S.-Dakota War of 1862, the low flat land in front of the mound became the site of Camp Lincoln. Here 303 Dakota men who had been convicted by Colonel Sibley's military commission were detained, along with Sibley's troops and several Dakota women who came to work at the camp. The commission had conducted a series of cursory sham trials and condemned 303 voluntarily surrendered Dakota men to death by hanging, despite personal written assurances from Sibley to treat fairly those who had presented themselves under a white flag. President Abraham Lincoln reviewed the trial transcripts with government lawyers and decided first that only rapists should be hanged. As there were only 2 identified cases of rape among the 303, which would not satisfy the desire for retribution of the settlers, Lincoln expanded the list to include 38 Dakota prisoners. These men were hanged on December 26, 1862 in downtown Mankato in the largest mass execution in American history.

Bicycle race at Sibley Park, 1892

Racetrack and grandstand at Sibley Park, 1913

The City of Mankato purchased the land at this site for its first city park on October 3, 1887. That same year, the park built a dirt oval track for horse and bicycle races with a grandstand and judging tower. A small zoo opened at Sibley Park in 1907 with a bear cage and it grew to feature a small collection of animals, including a bison herd and a lion. In April 1965, the zoo at Sibley Park was destroyed during a flood when the Blue Earth River broke through a dike. Sadly, most of the animals in the zoo died from drowning or exposure, including a pair of lions.

The park also includes a small wooden cabin built by George Ott, an early Mankato settler, in 1857. The Blue Earth County Historical Society moved the cabin to Sibley Park and restored it for visitors in the 1930s.

== Traditions ==
Every year Kiwanis International hosts a nightly Holiday Lights event from the end of November to the end of December. The mission of Kiwanis Holiday Lights is to create a celebration of Holiday Lights for the Greater Mankato Area that builds on past traditions and promotes the communities they serve, while raising non-perishable food donations for those in need. Sibley Park hosts the event every year since 2012.
