= Mankato, Minnesota =

City in Minnesota, United States

- City
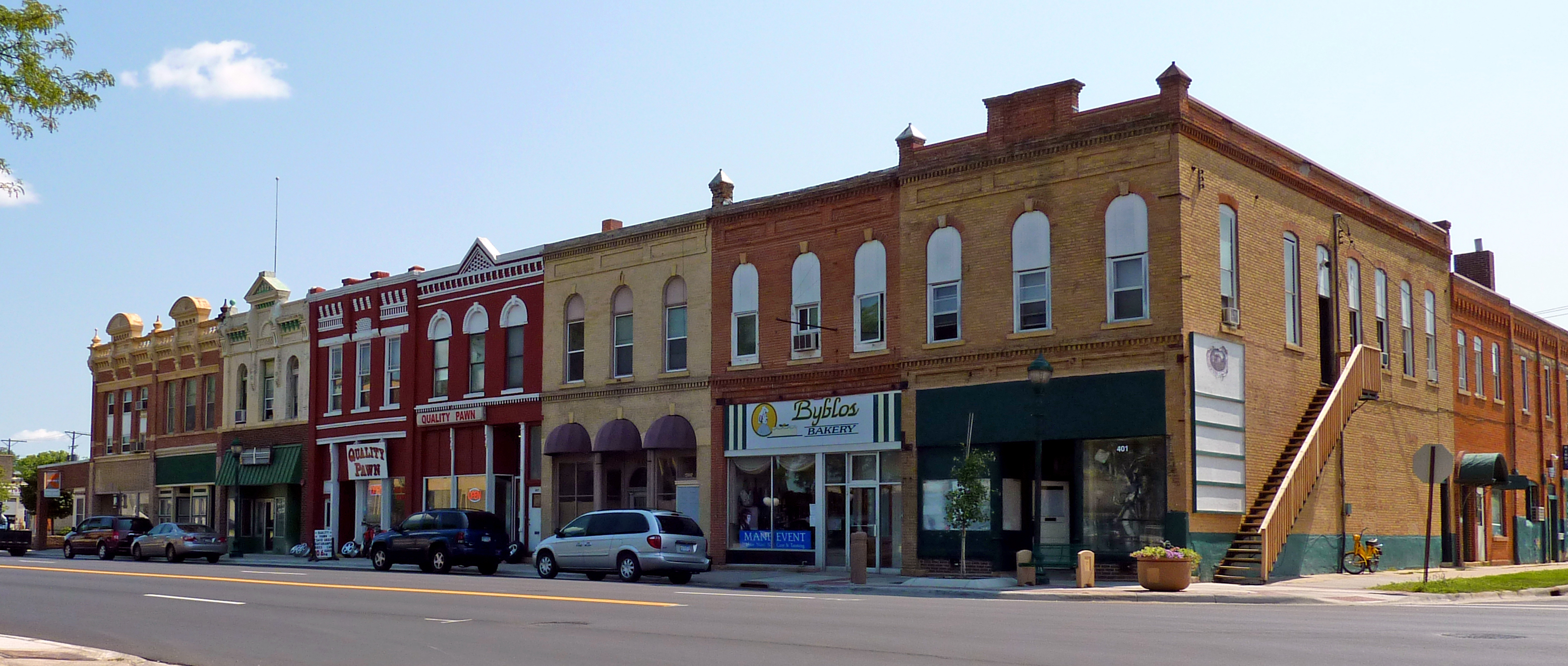
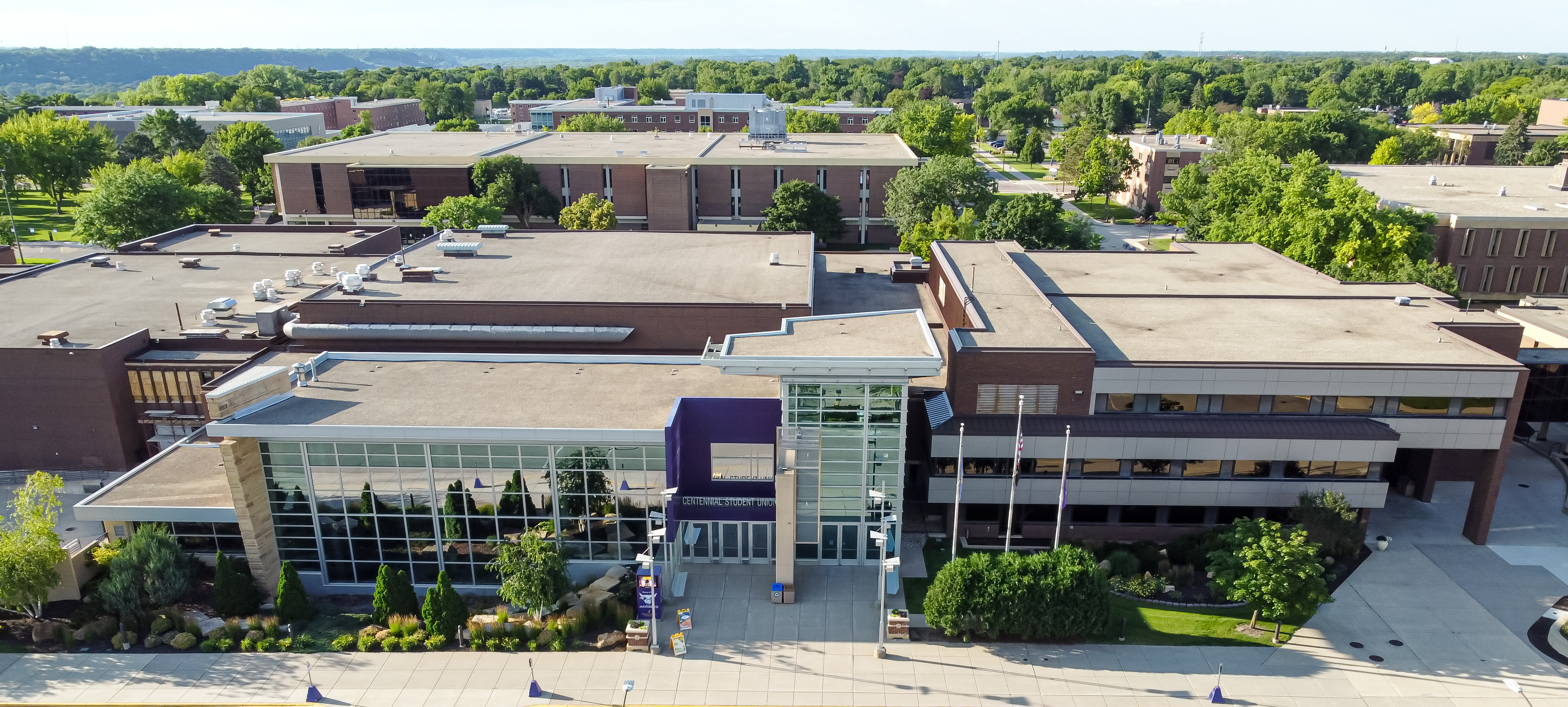
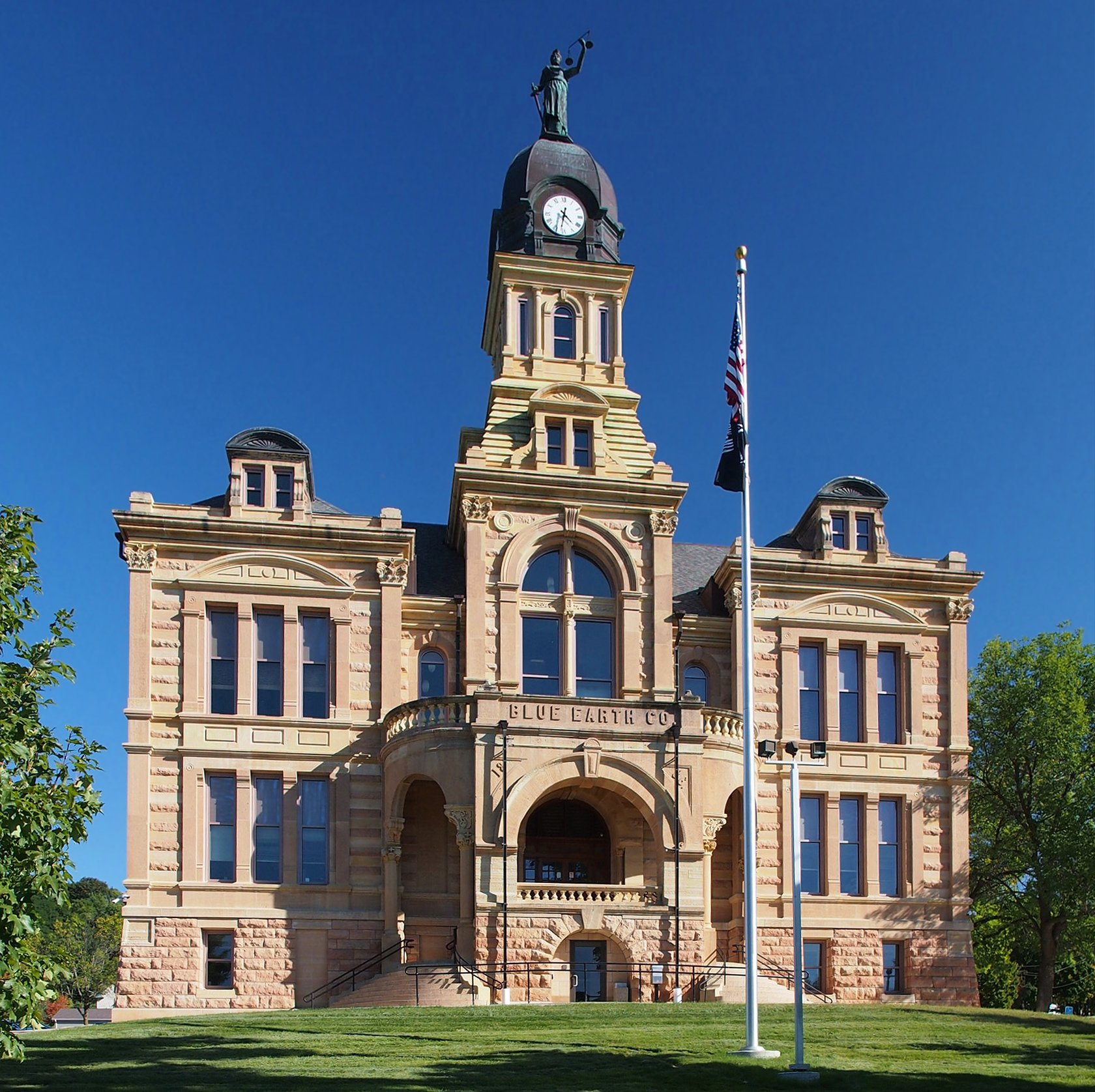
- Downtown Mankato North Riverfront Drive Minnesota State University, Mankato Historic Blue Earth County Courthouse

- Logo
- Nickname: Key City
- Motto: "Leading the way..."
- Interactive map of Mankato, Minnesota
- Location within Minnesota Location within the United States
- Coordinates: 44°09′53″N 94°00′50″W
- Country: United States
- State: Minnesota
- Counties: Blue Earth, Nicollet, Le Sueur
- Founded: February 1852
- Incorporated: March 6, 1868

Government
  - Type: City charter
  - Mayor: Najwa Massad
  - City manager: Susan Arntz
  - Councilmembers: Mike Laven; Michael McLaughlin; Dennis Dieken; Kevin Mettler; Jenn Melby-Kelley; Jessica Hatanpa

Area
  - City: 20.229 sq mi (52.393 km^{2})
  - Land: 19.879 sq mi (51.487 km^{2})
  - Water: 0.349 sq mi (0.905 km^{2})
- Elevation: 1,007 ft (307 m)

Population (2020)
  - City: 44,488
  - Estimate (2023): 45,742
  - Rank: US: 876th MN: 22nd
  - Density: 2,299.4/sq mi (887.79/km^{2})
  - Urban: 60,206 (US: 453rd)
  - Metro: 104,248 (US: 352nd)
- Demonym: Mankatoans
- Time zone: UTC−6 (Central (CST))
  - Summer (DST): UTC−5 (CDT)
- ZIP Codes: 56001, 56002, 56003
- Area codes: 507 and 924
- FIPS code: 27-39878
- GNIS feature ID: 2395831
- Sales tax: 7.875%
- Website: mankatomn.gov

Mankato (/mænˈkeɪtoʊ/ man-KAY-toh) is a city in Blue Earth, Nicollet, and Le Sueur counties in the U.S. state of Minnesota. It is the county seat of Blue Earth County. It is the 21st-largest city in Minnesota and fourth-largest outside of the Minneapolis–Saint Paul area, with a population of 44,488 at the 2020 census. The Mankato metropolitan area has an estimated 105,000 residents.

Mankato lies along a large bend of the Minnesota River at its confluence with the Blue Earth River. The city is home to Minnesota State University, the state's second-largest university by enrollment.

== History ==
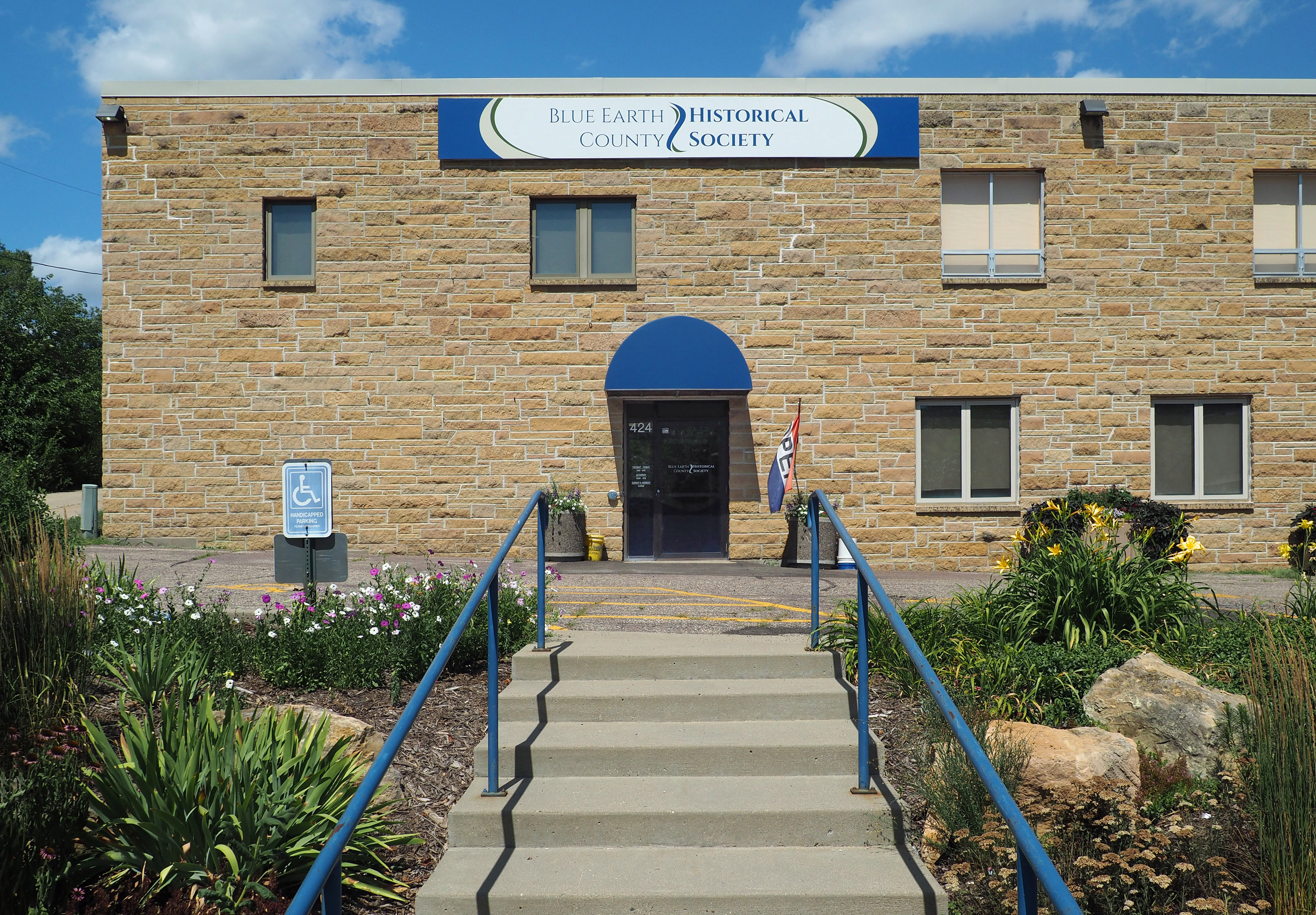
Blue Earth County History Center

Mankato Township was not settled by European Americans until Parsons King Johnson in February 1852, as part of the 19th-century migration of people from the east across the Midwest. New residents organized the city of Mankato on May 11, 1858, the day Minnesota became a state. The city was organized by Johnson, Henry Jackson, Daniel A. Robertson, Justus C. Ramsey, and others.

A popular story says that the city was supposed to have been named Mahkato, but a typographical error by a clerk established the name as Mankato. According to Warren Upham, quoting historian Thomas Hughes of Mankato, "The honor of christening the new city was accorded to Col. Robertson. He had taken the name from Nicollet's book, in which the French explorer compared the 'Mahkato' or Blue Earth River, with all its tributaries, to the water nymphs and their uncle in the German legend of Undine...No more appropriate name could be given the new city, than that of the noble river at whose mouth it is located." While it is uncertain that the city was intended to be called Mahkato, the Dakota called the river Makato Osa Watapa ("the river where blue earth is gathered"). The Anglo settlers adapted that as "Blue Earth River". Frederick Webb Hodge, in the Handbook of American Indians North of Mexico, said the town was named after the older of the two like-named chiefs of the Mdewakanton nation of the Santee Dakota, whose village stood on or near the site of the present town.

Ishtakhaba, also known as Chief Sleepy Eye, of the Sisseton band, was said to have directed settlers to this location. He said the site at the confluence of the Minnesota and Blue Earth Rivers was well suited to building and river traffic, and yet safe from flooding.

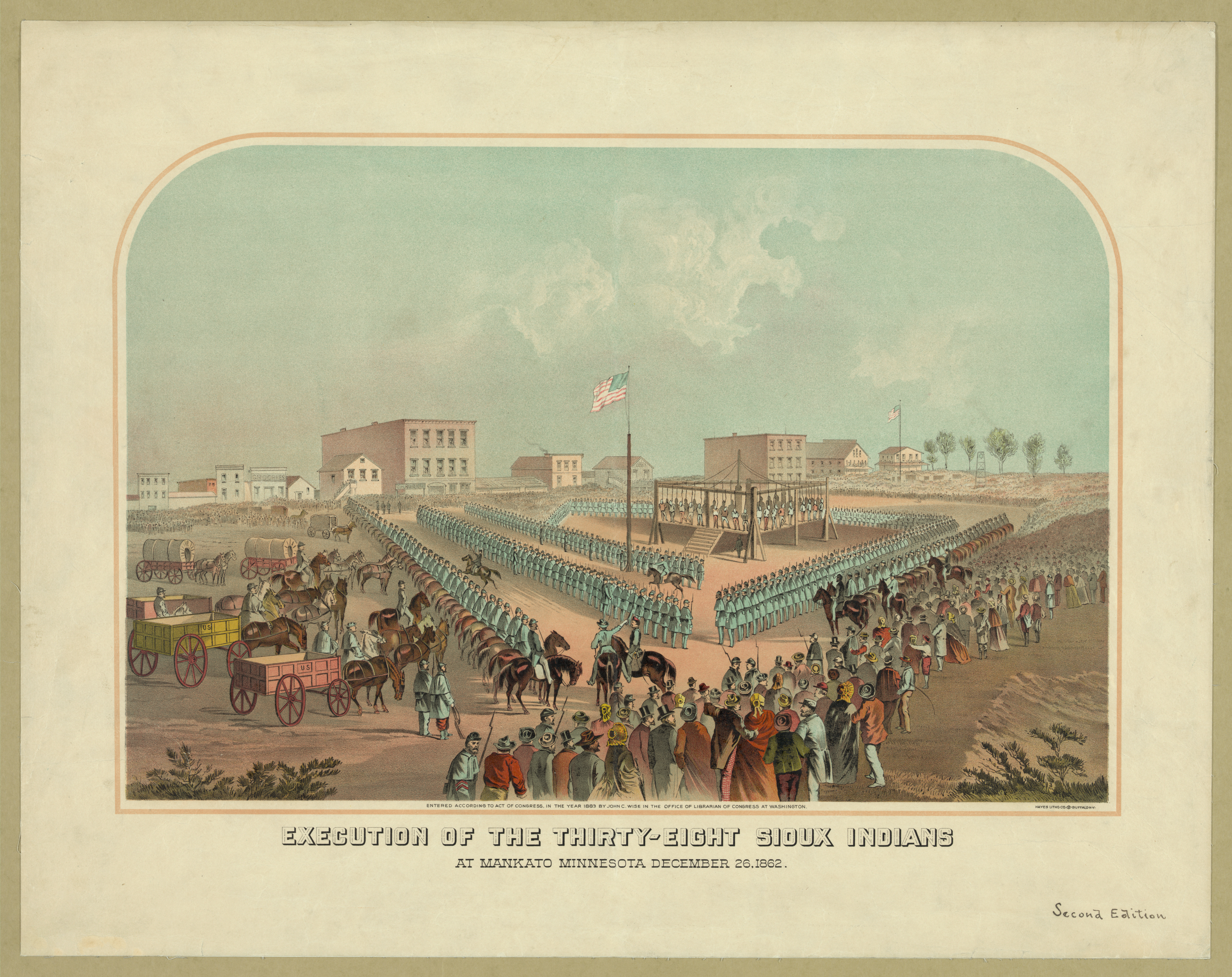
The mass execution of the 38 Sioux (Dakota) at Mankato, Minnesota, 1862

On December 26, 1862, United States Volunteers of the State of Minnesota carried out the largest mass execution in U.S. history at Mankato after the Dakota War of 1862. Companies of the 7th, 8th, 9th, 10th Minnesota Infantry Regiments, and Minnesota Cavalry oversaw the hanging of 38 men: 35 Santee Sioux and 3 biracial French/native American, for their involvement in the war crimes committed during the uprising. A USV military tribunal reviewed nearly 500 cases, of which 303 received a death sentence, but President Abraham Lincoln requested the court files. He reviewed them, placing the rape cases at the top, and pardoning 264. Episcopal Bishop Henry Benjamin Whipple urged leniency, to which Lincoln responded that he had to take a balanced approach. His position and dismissals were unpopular in Minnesota. To commemorate the 50th anniversary of the event a large granite marker was erected that stood at the site until 1971, when the city took it down. Today, a different monument marks the execution site. Across the street are two monuments to the Native Americans in what it called Reconciliation Park. The Blue Earth County Library, Main street and Reconciliation Park cover the immediate vicinity of the execution site.

In 1880, Mankato was Minnesota's fourth-most populous city, with 5,500 residents.

Former Vice President and Speaker of the House Schuyler Colfax died while traveling through Mankato on January 13, 1885 after walking to the train station in -30 degree weather.

== Geography ==
According to the United States Census Bureau, the city has a total area of 20.229 square miles (52.39 km^{2}), of which 19.879 square miles (51.49 km^{2}) is land and 0.350 square miles (0.91 km^{2}) is water. The Minnesota, Blue Earth, and Le Sueur rivers all flow through or near the city.

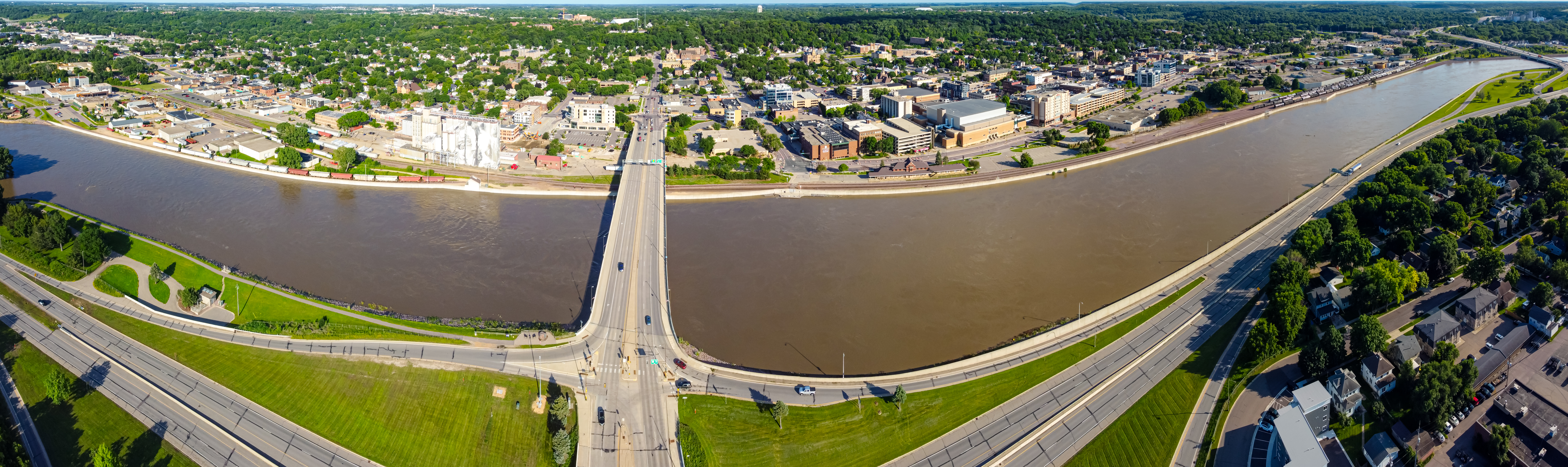

=== Climate ===
Mankato has a humid continental climate, type Dfa (hot summer subtype). Winters are cold, with snow cover (continuous most winter seasons) beginning typically between mid-November and mid-December, ending in March most years. However, Mankato often receives less snow than areas to its north and east. For example, Minneapolis, 75 miles (121 km) northeast of Mankato, averages over 54 inches (140 cm) of snow per winter season, compared to Mankato's seasonal average of 35 inches (89 cm). The coldest month, January, has an average monthly temperature around 14 °F (−10 °C). Dangerously low windchill temperatures are a significant hazard during the winter months, as Arctic air outbreaks rush into the area from Canada, borne on high winds; this can bring about ground blizzard conditions, especially in nearby rural areas.

Summers are warm, with occasional but usually brief hot, humid periods, often interspersed with pushes of cooler air from Canada, often preceded by showers and thunderstorms. The hottest month, July, has an average monthly temperature of around 73 °F (22.8 °C). Precipitation falls year round, but falls mostly as snow from December to February, sometimes March, and as showers and thunderstorms during the warmer season, from May to September. Mankato's average wettest months are from June to August, with frequent thunderstorm activity. Mankato lies on the northern fringe of the central United States' main tornado belt, with lower risk than in Iowa and Missouri to the south. The highest-risk months for severe thunderstorms and (rarely) tornadoes, are May through July. However, a very unusual early tornado outbreak affected areas within 20 miles (32 km) of Mankato on March 29, 1998, when an F3 tornado hit St. Peter, 13 miles (21 km) to the north. On August 17, 1946, tornadoes struck southwestern areas of Mankato and the town of Wells to the southeast, killing 11 people.

Climate data for Mankato, Minnesota, 1991–2020 normals, extremes 1954–present
Month	Jan	Feb	Mar	Apr	May	Jun	Jul	Aug	Sep	Oct	Nov	Dec	Year
Record high °F (°C)	61 (16)	67 (19)	84 (29)	94 (34)	100 (38)	105 (41)	104 (40)	107 (42)	99 (37)	92 (33)	83 (28)	69 (21)	107 (42)
Mean maximum °F (°C)	43.4 (6.3)	47.3 (8.5)	65.7 (18.7)	81.4 (27.4)	89.3 (31.8)	93.3 (34.1)	92.3 (33.5)	89.9 (32.2)	88.5 (31.4)	82.5 (28.1)	66.0 (18.9)	47.3 (8.5)	95.6 (35.3)
Mean daily maximum °F (°C)	23.7 (−4.6)	28.6 (−1.9)	40.9 (4.9)	56.5 (13.6)	69.2 (20.7)	78.8 (26.0)	81.9 (27.7)	79.5 (26.4)	73.6 (23.1)	59.8 (15.4)	43.4 (6.3)	28.6 (−1.9)	55.4 (13.0)
Daily mean °F (°C)	14.7 (−9.6)	19.0 (−7.2)	31.4 (−0.3)	45.2 (7.3)	58.1 (14.5)	68.2 (20.1)	71.8 (22.1)	69.5 (20.8)	61.9 (16.6)	48.6 (9.2)	34.1 (1.2)	20.6 (−6.3)	45.3 (7.4)
Mean daily minimum °F (°C)	5.7 (−14.6)	9.4 (−12.6)	21.9 (−5.6)	33.9 (1.1)	47.0 (8.3)	57.7 (14.3)	61.7 (16.5)	59.4 (15.2)	50.1 (10.1)	37.4 (3.0)	24.7 (−4.1)	12.7 (−10.7)	35.1 (1.7)
Mean minimum °F (°C)	−17.1 (−27.3)	−11.0 (−23.9)	−0.5 (−18.1)	20.3 (−6.5)	33.6 (0.9)	45.9 (7.7)	52.5 (11.4)	49.6 (9.8)	35.5 (1.9)	22.7 (−5.2)	6.7 (−14.1)	−9.4 (−23.0)	−19.4 (−28.6)
Record low °F (°C)	−34 (−37)	−35 (−37)	−24 (−31)	3 (−16)	22 (−6)	35 (2)	44 (7)	38 (3)	23 (−5)	12 (−11)	−15 (−26)	−32 (−36)	−35 (−37)
Average precipitation inches (mm)	0.99 (25)	0.84 (21)	1.88 (48)	3.31 (84)	4.20 (107)	5.64 (143)	4.26 (108)	4.31 (109)	3.30 (84)	2.37 (60)	1.65 (42)	1.13 (29)	33.88 (860)
Average snowfall inches (cm)	8.2 (21)	6.9 (18)	7.4 (19)	1.6 (4.1)	0.0 (0.0)	0.0 (0.0)	0.0 (0.0)	0.0 (0.0)	0.0 (0.0)	0.1 (0.25)	5.9 (15)	8.6 (22)	38.7 (99.35)
Average precipitation days (≥ 0.01 in)	6.4	5.2	7.8	9.6	11.1	11.5	9.4	9.1	7.8	7.7	6.2	6.9	98.7
Average snowy days (≥ 0.1 in)	5.1	4.2	4.1	0.7	0.0	0.0	0.0	0.0	0.0	0.1	2.7	5.6	22.5
Source 1: NOAA
Source 2: National Weather Service

== Demographics ==
Historical population
Census	Pop.	Note	%±
1870	3,482		—
1880	5,550		59.4%
1890	8,838		59.2%
1900	10,599		19.9%
1910	10,365		−2.2%
1920	12,469		20.3%
1930	14,039		12.6%
1940	15,654		11.5%
1950	18,809		20.2%
1960	23,797		26.5%
1970	30,895		29.8%
1980	28,651		−7.3%
1990	31,477		9.9%
2000	32,427		3.0%
2010	39,309		21.2%
2020	44,488		13.2%
2023 (est.)	45,742		2.8%
U.S. Decennial Census; 2020 Census

=== Racial and ethnic composition ===
Mankato, Minnesota – racial and ethnic composition Note: the US Census treats Hispanic/Latino as an ethnic category. This table excludes Latinos from the racial categories and assigns them to a separate category. Hispanics/Latinos may be of any race.
Race / ethnicity (NH = non-Hispanic)	Pop. 2000	Pop. 2010	Pop. 2020	% 2000	% 2010	% 2020
White alone (NH)	29,670	34,656	34,381	91.50%	88.16%	77.28%
Black or African American alone (NH)	608	1,560	3,652	1.87%	3.97%	8.21%
Native American or Alaska Native alone (NH)	100	104	162	0.31%	0.26%	0.36%
Asian alone (NH)	903	1,092	1,698	2.78%	2.78%	3.82%
Pacific Islander alone (NH)	30	16	21	0.09%	0.04%	0.05%
Other race alone (NH)	21	37	184	0.06%	0.09%	0.41%
Mixed race or multiracial (NH)	376	691	1,801	1.16%	1.76%	4.05%
Hispanic or Latino (any race)	719	1,153	2,589	2.22%	2.93%	5.82%
Total	32,427	39,309	44,488	100.00%	100.00%	100.00%

=== American Community Survey ===
As of the 2022 American Community Survey, there are 17,605 estimated households in Mankato with an average of 2.31 persons per household. The city has a median household income of $61,726. Approximately 22.5% of the city's population lives at or below the poverty line. Mankato has an estimated 71.1% employment rate, with 37.6% of the population holding a bachelor's degree or higher and 93.6% holding a high school diploma.

The top five reported ancestries (people were allowed to report up to two ancestries, thus the figures will generally add to more than 100%) were English (89.5), Spanish (2.7%), Other Indo-European (1.6%), Asian and Pacific Islander (2.2%), and other (3.9%).

=== 2020 census ===
As of the 2020 census, there were 44,488 people, 17,576 households, and 8,344 families residing in the city. The population density was 2,305.2 inhabitants per square mile (890.0/km^{2}).

The median age was 27.7 years; 5.0% of residents were under age 5, 18.3% were under the age of 18, and 13.5% were 65 years of age or older.

For every 100 females there were 98.8 males, and for every 100 females age 18 and over there were 95.8 males age 18 and over.

99.9% of residents lived in urban areas, while 0.1% lived in rural areas.

Of the 17,576 households, 23.5% had children under the age of 18 living in them. Of all households, 32.9% were married-couple households, 26.1% were households with a male householder and no spouse or partner present, and 32.2% were households with a female householder and no spouse or partner present. About 34.4% of all households were made up of individuals and 10.8% had someone living alone who was 65 years of age or older.

There were 18,855 housing units at an average density of 977.0 inhabitants per square mile (377.2/km^{2}); 6.8% were vacant. The homeowner vacancy rate was 1.2% and the rental vacancy rate was 8.2%.

Racial composition as of the 2020 census
Race	Number	Percent
White	35,156	79.0%
Black or African American	3,744	8.4%
American Indian and Alaska Native	238	0.5%
Asian	1,703	3.8%
Native Hawaiian and Other Pacific Islander	29	0.1%
Some other race	1,044	2.3%
Two or more races	2,574	5.8%
Hispanic or Latino (of any race)	2,589	5.8%

=== 2010 census ===
As of the 2010 census, there were 39,309 people, 14,851 households, and 7,093 families residing in the city. The population density was 2,195.3 inhabitants per square mile (847.6/km^{2}). There were 15,784 housing units at an average density of 881.3 per square mile (340.3/km^{2}). The racial makeup was 89.94% White, 4.03% African American, 0.34% Native American, 2.78% Asian, 0.04% Pacific Islander, 0.81% from some other races and 2.07% from two or more races. Hispanic or Latino people of any race were 2.93% of the population.

There were 14,851 households, of which 22.5% had children under the age of 18 living with them, 35.0% were married couples living together, 9.0% had a female householder with no husband present, 3.7% had a male householder with no wife present, and 52.2% were non-families. 30.9% of all households were made up of individuals, and 9.4% had someone living alone who was 65 years of age or older. The average household size was 2.35 and the average family size was 2.91.

The median age in the city was 25.4 years. 16.3% of residents were under the age of 18; 32.6% were between the ages of 18 and 24; 23.8% were from 25 to 44; 16.6% were from 45 to 64; and 10.6% were 65 years of age or older. The city's gender makeup was 50.0% male and 50.0% female.

=== 2000 census ===
As of the 2000 census, there were 32,427 people, 12,367 households, and 6,059 families residing in the city. The population density was 2,132.5 inhabitants per square mile (823.4/km^{2}). There were 12,759 housing units at an average density of 839.1 inhabitants per square mile (324.0/km^{2}). The racial makeup was 92.55% White, 1.90% African American, 0.34% Native American, 2.81% Asian, 0.10% Pacific Islander, 0.94% from some other races, and 1.36% from two or more races. Hispanic or Latino people of any race were 2.22% of the population.

There were 12,367 households, of which 23.6% had children under the age of 18 living with them, 36.7% were married couples living together, 8.8% had a female householder with no husband present, and 51.0% were non-families. 32.2% of all households were made up of individuals, and 9.9% had someone living alone who was 65 years of age or older. The average household size was 2.31 and the average family size was 2.90.

16.9% of the city's residents were under the age of 18; 32.5% were between age 18 and 24; 23.9% were from 25 to 44; 15.4% were from 45 to 64; and 11.3% were age 65 or older. The median age was 25 years. For every 100 females, there were 96.7 males. For every 100 females age 18 and over, there were 95.5 males.

The median income for a household in the city was $33,956, and the median income for a family was $47,297. Males had a median income of $30,889 versus $22,081 for females. The per capita income for the city was $17,652. About 8.5% of families and 19.0% of the population were below the poverty line, including 15.6% of those under age 18 and 11.8% of those age 65 or over.

== Economy ==
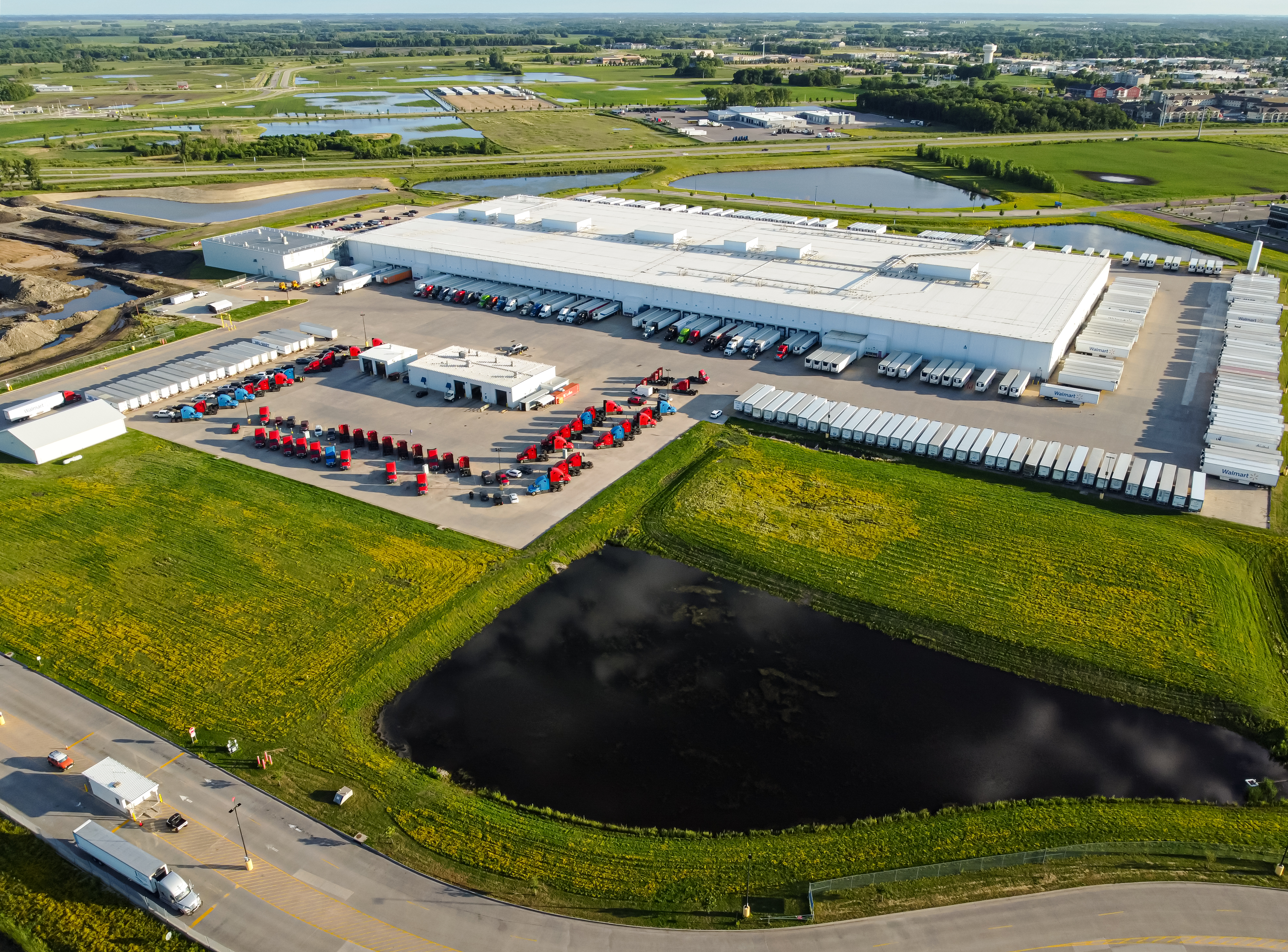
Walmart distribution center in Mankato

=== Top employers ===
According to the city's 2025 Annual Comprehensive Financial Report, the largest employers in the city are:

#	Employer	# of employees	Percentage
1	Minnesota State University, Mankato	1,600	6.01%
2	Mayo Clinic Health System - Mankato	1,300	4.88%
3	Mankato Area Public Schools ISD #77	1,200	4.50%
4	Mankato Clinic	425	1.60%
5	Walmart Distribution Center	385	1.44%
6	Mankato Rehabilitation Center Inc. Industrial Operation	375	1.41%
7	The City of Mankato	370	1.39%
8	Blue Earth County	365	1.37%
9	Dotson Company	364	1.37%
10	MTU Onsite Energy	300	1.13%
—	Total employers	6,684	25.10%

== Arts and culture ==
=== Major events ===
- Minnesota State University was home to the Minnesota Vikings summer training camp for 52 years. The Vikings announced their training camp would move to Eagan starting in 2018.

=== Places of interest ===
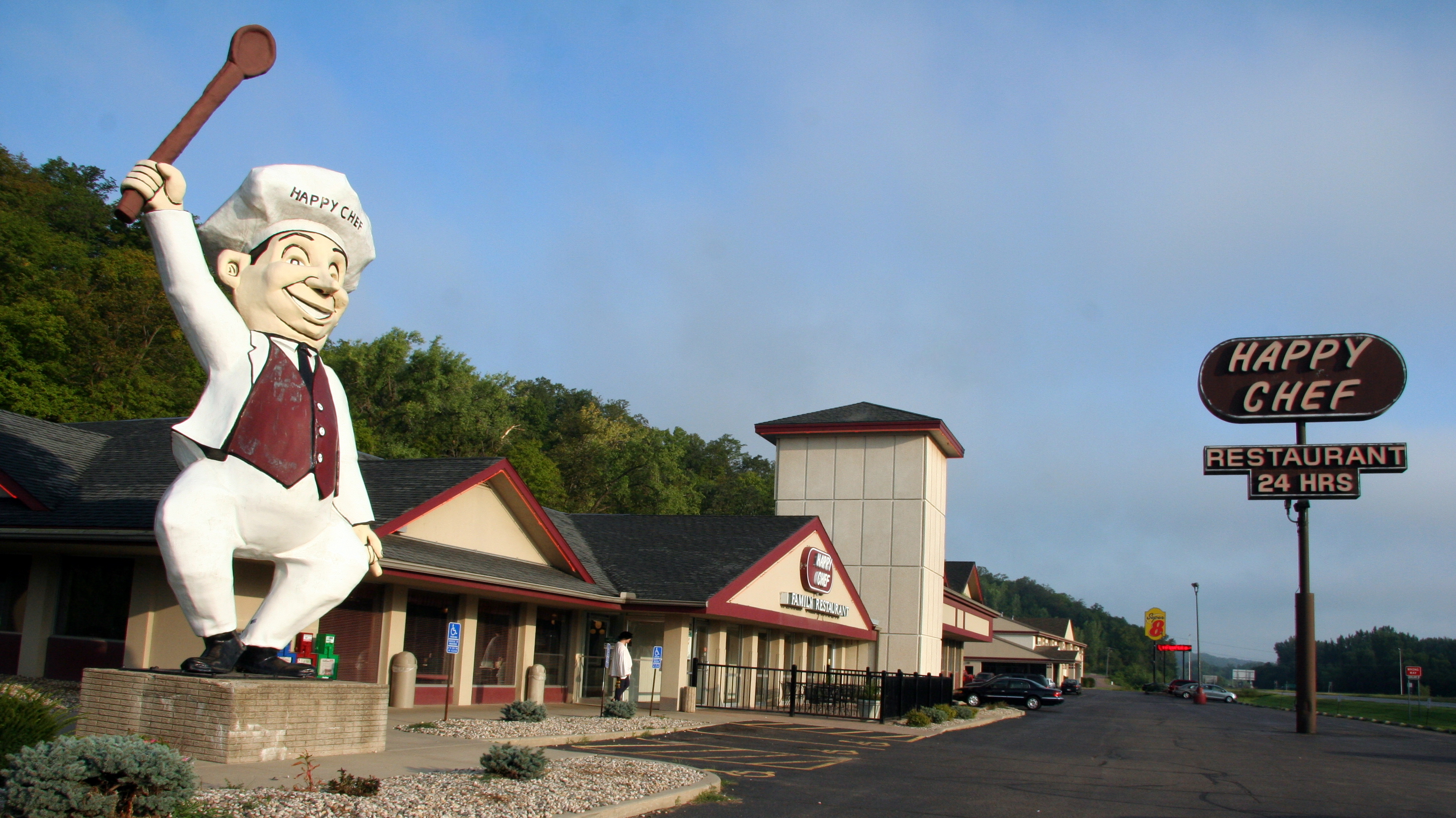
The original Happy Chef Restaurant and corporate offices on U.S. Highway 169

- The Betsy & Tacy Houses
- Blue Earth County Courthouse, listed on the National Register of Historic Places (NRHP)
- Children's Museum of Southern Minnesota
- Federal Courthouse and Post Office (NRHP)
- First National Bank of Mankato (NRHP)
- First Presbyterian Church (NRHP)
- Good Counsel Hill
- Happy Chef original restaurant and company headquarters; Mankato also is home to the last surviving 36-foot (11 m) Happy Chef statue
- The Hubbard House Blue Earth County Historical Society – French Second Empire style built in 1871 (NRHP)
- ISG Field, home of the Mankato Moondogs of the Northwoods League, a collegiate summer baseball league
- The Cray Mansion (NRHP)
- River Hills Mall
- Sibley Park is a city park along the river in Mankato.
- The Mayo Clinic Health System Event Center, an arena in downtown Mankato formerly operated under the names Mankato Civic Center, Midwest Wireless Civic Center, Alltel Center, Verizon Wireless Center, and Verizon Center
- Vetter Stone Amphitheater

=== Library ===
The Blue Earth County Library, part of the Traverse des Sioux Library System, serves the city.

== Government ==
United States presidential election results for Mankato, Minnesota
Year	Republican		Democratic		Third party(ies)	
Year	No.	%	No.	%	No.	%
2000	6,465	42.37%	7,349	48.16%	1,446	9.48%
2004	8,224	43.06%	10,573	55.35%	304	1.59%
2008	8,099	38.01%	12,632	59.29%	575	2.70%
2012	7,942	38.45%	11,901	57.62%	812	3.93%
2016	8,056	39.73%	9,922	48.94%	2,297	11.33%
2020	8,032	37.69%	12,651	59.36%	628	2.95%
2024	9,175	42.12%	12,079	55.46%	527	2.42%

Mankato is in Minnesota's 1st congressional district, represented by Brad Finstad. It is in Minnesota Senate district 18, represented by Nick Frentz, and Minnesota House district 18B, represented by Luke Frederick. Mankato voted for Joe Biden in the 2020 presidential election.

== Education ==
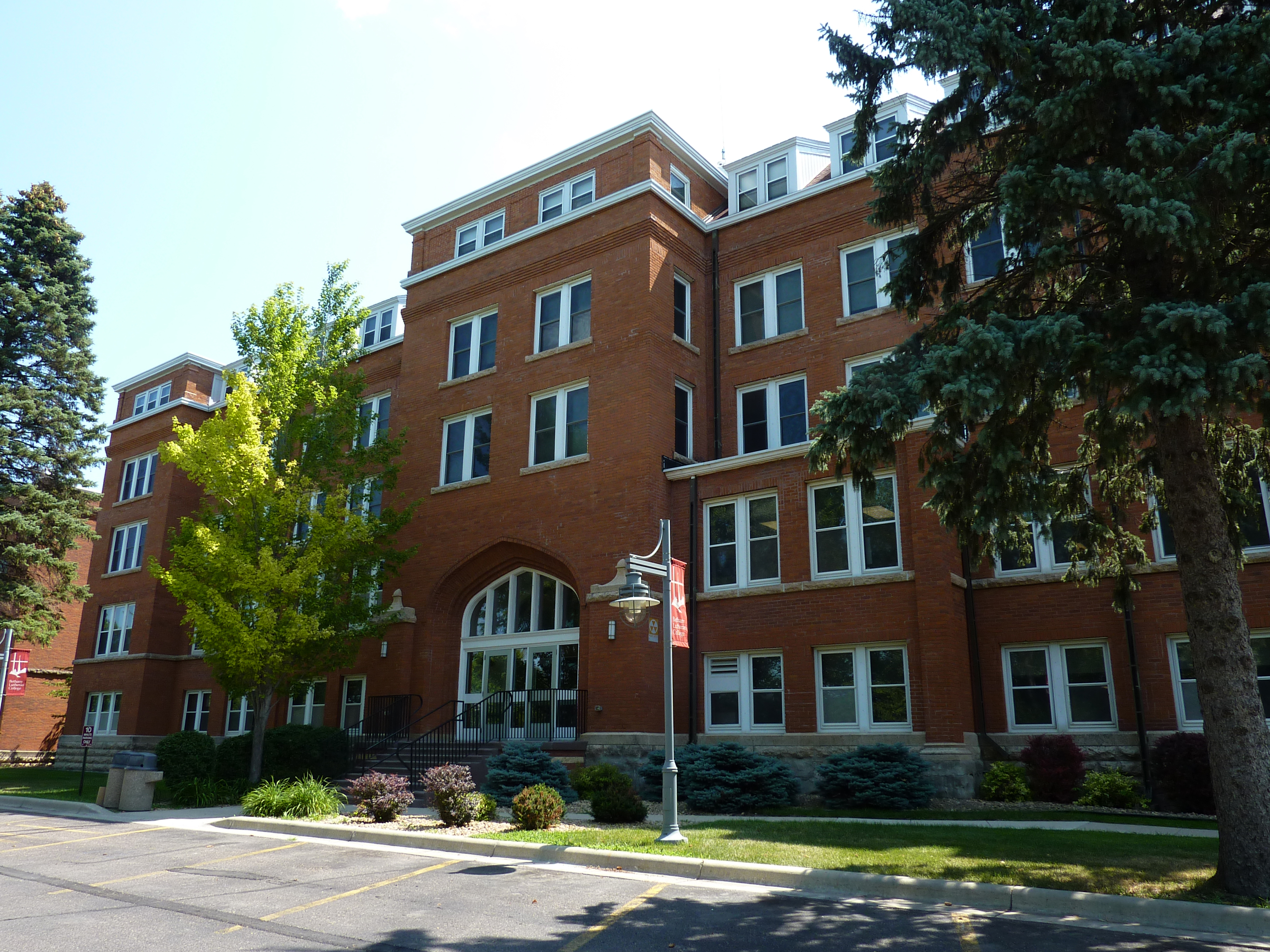
Old Main, Bethany Lutheran College

The Mankato Area Public Schools are consolidated to include the cities of Mankato, North Mankato, Eagle Lake, and Madison Lake. There are ten elementary schools (Franklin, Eagle Lake, Kennedy, Washington, Roosevelt, Jefferson, Monroe, Hoover, Rosa Parks, and Bridges); two middle schools (Dakota Meadows Middle School and Prairie Winds Middle School); and two high schools (Mankato West High School and Mankato East High School).

Mankato has four parochial schools: Loyola Catholic School, Immanuel Lutheran Grade School and High School (K–12), Mount Olive Lutheran School (K–8) and Risen Savior Lutheran School (K–8). Mankato Christian Academy (9-12) is not a parochial school, but is another private school. The alternative school Central High (Part of Mankato Area Public Schools), on Fulton Street, is another educational option. There was also a public charter school, Kato Public Charter School, but it was forced to close after the 2024–25 school year due to poor test scores.

=== Higher education institutions ===
- Minnesota State University was opened as the second state normal school in 1868 and is the second largest university in the state of Minnesota by enrollment. With an annual operating budget of over $200 million, Minnesota State provides a net economic benefit of over $452 million annually to Minnesota's south-central region. It is one of the largest employers in the Mankato area.
- South Central College
- Bethany Lutheran College
- Rasmussen University

== Media ==
The major daily newspaper in the area is the Mankato Free Press.

=== Television ===
- KMNF-CD 7 (NBC/CW)
- KEYC-TV 12 (CBS/Fox)
- K14KE-D 14 (independent, repeater of KSTC)
- K26CS-D 26 (PBS, repeater of KTCA)
- K29IE-D 29 (PBS, repeater of KTCI)
- K30FN-D 30 (ABC, repeater of KSTP-TV)

=== Radio ===
==== FM ====
- 89.1 FM, KTIS (AM), Christian talk and teaching
- 89.7 FM, KMSU, college radio
- 90.5 FM, KNGA, Minnesota Public Radio
- 91.5 FM, KGAC, classical
- 93.1 FM, KATO-FM, classic hits
- 94.1 FM, KXLP, classic rock
- 94.9 FM, KTIS-FM, contemporary Christian music
- 95.3 FM, KCMP, adult album alternative
- 95.7 FM, KMKO-FM, active rock
- 96.7 FM, KDOG, top 40
- 99.1 FM, KEEZ-FM, adult contemporary
- 100.5 FM, KXAC, country
- 101.5 FM, KEMJ, adult contemporary
- 101.7 FM, KMKO-FM, active rock
- 102.7 FM, KTOE, news/talk
- 103.1 FM, KFSP, sport talk
- 103.5 FM, KYSM-FM, country
- 104.5 FM, KJLY, Christian
- 105.1 FM, KCMP, adult album alternative
- 105.5 FM, KRBI-FM, adult contemporary
- 107.1 FM, KJLY, Christian

==== AM ====
- 860, KNUJ (AM), news/talk
- 1230, KFSP, sports talk
- 1420, KTOE, news/talk

== Infrastructure ==
=== Transportation ===
Public transportation in Mankato is provided by the Mankato Transit System. The city is served by Mankato Regional Airport, which has no commercial flights. Under MnDOT's 2015 State Rail Plan, Mankato is listed as a Tier 1 Corridor for regional rail service from Minneapolis and/or St. Paul. U.S. Highways 14 and 169 and Minnesota State Highways 22 and 60 are four of Mankato's main routes.

==== Major highways ====
The following routes are within the city of Mankato:

- U.S. Highway 14
- U.S. Highway 169
- Minnesota State Highway 22
- Minnesota State Highway 60
- Minnesota State Highway 83

== In popular culture ==
The protagonist of Sinclair Lewis's 1920 novel Main Street, Carol Milford, is a former Mankato resident. Lewis describes Mankato as follows: "In its garden-sheltered streets and aisles of elms is white and green New England reborn", alluding to its many migrants from New England, who brought their culture with them. Lewis wrote a substantial portion of the novel while staying at the J.W. Schmidt House at 315 South Broad Street, as now marked by a small plaque in front of the building.

In 1996, Don Descy created the website city-mankato.us, which was filled with a wildly inaccurate portrayal of the city. Descy described it as a tool for teaching that not everything on the internet should be believed.

== Hotdish ==
In 2016 Food & Wine credited a 1930 Mankato church congregation cookbook as the first written record of a hotdish recipe. Many churches publish cookbooks with recipes submitted by their congregation as fund raisers. The source included neither the name of the woman who invented the recipe nor the source. Mankato resident Joyce Nelson had a copy of the 1930 Lutheran church recipe book and it was found that the recipe was indeed included in that year's cookbook. Mrs. C. W. Anderson had submitted a recipe for a "HOT DISH" made with hamburger, onions, Creamette pasta, celery, a can of peas, tomato soup and tomatoes.

== Notable people ==
- Daniel Akerson, former CEO of General Motors
- Barry Anderson, associate justice of the Minnesota Supreme Court
- Walter Jackson Bate, Pulitzer Prize-winning biographer, born in Mankato in 1918
- Daniel Buck, Minnesota jurist and politician
- Con Bunde, Alaska state legislator and educator
- Frederick Russell Burnham, "father of the international scouting movement", born near Mankato in 1861
- Howard Burnham, mining engineer, born near Mankato in 1870
- Joseph Francis Busch, Roman Catholic prelate, Diocese of Rapid City, Diocese of Saint Cloud, Minnesota
- Jimmy Chin, professional climber and mountaineer, Academy Award winner for Best Documentary
- George Contant, outlaw of the American West, brother of John Sontag
- Marvel Cooke, journalist, writer and civil rights activist
- David R. Cummiskey, Minnesota legislator
- Craig Dahl, NFL safety, New York Giants
- Adolph Olson Eberhart, seventeenth governor of Minnesota
- William S. Ervin, attorney general of Minnesota
- Ronald G. Evans, Minnesota legislator and businessman
- Cliff Fagan, basketball referee, Basketball Hall of Fame
- Sal Frederick, Minnesota legislator and businessman
- Kelly Gage, Minnesota legislator and lawyer
- Milton Hanna, Civil War veteran, Medal of Honor recipient
- Justin Hartwig, former NFL center
- Geoff Herbach, novelist
- Robert Louis Hodapp, Roman Catholic bishop
- Val Imm, Minnesota legislator and newspaper editor
- Ron Johnson, U.S. senator for Wisconsin
- Jack Kodell, stage magician
- Sinclair Lewis, author
- Mike Lindell, founder of MyPillow
- Maud Hart Lovelace, author of the Betsy-Tacy series of books
- Bob Paffrath, professional football player
- Melissa Peterman, actress and comedian, graduated from Minnesota State University
- Mark Piepho, Minnesota politician and businessman
- Mike Ploog, comic book and film-production artist
- Edmund Mann Pope, United States military officer, businessman, and Minnesota state senator
- Jeanne Audrey Powers, leader within the United Methodist Church and advocate for women and LGBTQ+ people in the church
- Dudley Riggs, Brave New Workshop, graduated from Minnesota State University, Mankato
- Joseph Rosser, secretary of Minnesota Territory and lawyer
- Daniel L. Ryan, Roman Catholic bishop
- Ervin Harold Schulz, businessman, newspaper editor, and Minnesota politician
- Roy F. Schulz, farmer and Minnesota politician
- Julia Sears, pioneering feminist and suffragette
- John Sontag, outlaw, born in Mankato; crimes in Minnesota and California
- Steven B. Szarke, born in Mankato, Minnesota state legislator and lawyer
- Glen Taylor
- Adam Thielen, NFL wide receiver, Minnesota Vikings, graduated from Minnesota State University
- Arthur S. Thomas, chief of chaplains of the U.S. Air Force
- John Eaton Tourtellotte, lawyer, Civil War general
- Alma Wagen, first female guide at Mount Rainier National Park
- Tim Walz, 41st governor of Minnesota, former U.S. representative for Minnesota's 1st congressional district, and running mate for Kamala Harris in the 2024 United States presidential election
- Cedric Yarbrough, actor, graduated from Minnesota State University
- Steve Zahn, actor and comedian, was raised in Mankato

== See also ==
- National Register of Historic Places listings in Blue Earth County, Minnesota
- List of Minnesota placenames of Native American origin
