= Children's Museum of Southern Minnesota =

Museum in Mankato, Minnesota, US

- Established: 1 May 2015
- Location: Mankato, MN
- Coordinates: 44.1619°N 94.0134°W
- Type: Children's Museum
- Chairperson: Kim Kleven
- Parking: On-Site
- Website: https://www.cmsouthernmn.org/

Children's Museum of Southern Minnesota (CMSM) is a children's museum located in Mankato, Minnesota. It features regularly scheduled art and science activities.

Indoor exhibits include an interactive quarry, a tree made of tree forts, and a vertical wind-tunnel. The museum offers seasonal farm exhibits outdoors during the warmer months.

== History ==
A group of educators began efforts to open a children's museum in 2009. In the summer of 2014, flood waters damaged the museum's planned exhibits. After rebuilding the exhibits, CMSM opened on the 1st of May, 2015.

== Location ==
The chosen site of the museum required extensive cleanup in partnership with the Minnesota Pollution Control Agency. With funding from a grant, over 2,500 tons of polluted soil and waste were removed. The existing building was made safe for renovation and use.
