= Steven B. Szarke =

American lawyer

Steven B. Szarke (born February 27, 1944) is an American former politician and lawyer.

Szarke was born in Mankato, Minnesota. He received his bachelor's degree in economics from St. Cloud State University and his Juris Doctor degree from William Mitchell College of Law. Szarke was admitted to the Minnesota bar. He lived in Buffalo, Minnesota. Szarke served in the Minnesota House of Representatives in 1971 and 1972 and was a Republican.
