= Jack Kodell =

American stage magician

- Born: John Edward Kodelka; November 4, 1927; Mankato, Minnesota, U.S.
- Died: May 17, 2012 (aged 84); Orlando, Florida, U.S.
- Occupation(s): Stage magician, illusionist
- Years active: 1940s–1962
- Partner: Mary Naylor (m.1953)

Jack Kodell (born John Edward Kodelka; November 4, 1927 – May 17, 2012) was an American stage magician.

== Biography ==
Born in Mankato, Minnesota, he was encouraged by his father to "do something different". By the age of nine he learned to fly a Taylor Cub airplane, and at 13 became the Soap Box Derby champion. While bedridden with rheumatic fever in his teens, he learned card tricks and, after moving with his parents to Chicago, began frequenting magic stores and learning new routines. He saw prestidigitator Bill Baird performing with billiard balls, and taught himself similar tricks but using live cockatiels or parakeets, inventing the idea of "bird manipulation".

He developed his act, began using the stage name Jack Kodell, and in 1947 won an award as most original magician at the International Magic Convention in Chicago, where Harry Blackstone Sr. said: "This young boy has revolutionised magic..". Kodell started appearing at the El Rancho casino and hotel in Las Vegas, becoming the first magician to be featured in the city. He toured around the world, and frequently visited Britain, where he met English entertainer Mary Naylor; they married in 1953. At that time, Kodell was presenting his magic tricks in an ice show at the Empress Hall, Earl's Court.

He continued to perform around the world, and was a headlining act in 14 countries. As well as seeming to make small live birds appear between his fingers, he performed with larger birds such as pigeons and macaws, and at the end of his routine, when walking off stage, up to 50 doves would fly from the back of theatre to accompany him. He was credited as a major influence by stage illusionist David Copperfield.

He retired from performing in 1962, aged 34, and formed a company, Incentive Travel, which turned redundant cruise ships into entertainment venues by building stages over ballroom floors, suitable for large musical theatre productions.

In 1995, Kodell was given the Academy of Magical Arts Performing Fellowship award. In 1997, he and his wife moved to Orlando, Florida, where he died in 2012, aged 84.
