= First Presbyterian Church (Mankato, Minnesota) =

Historic church in Minnesota, United States

- U.S. National Register of Historic Places
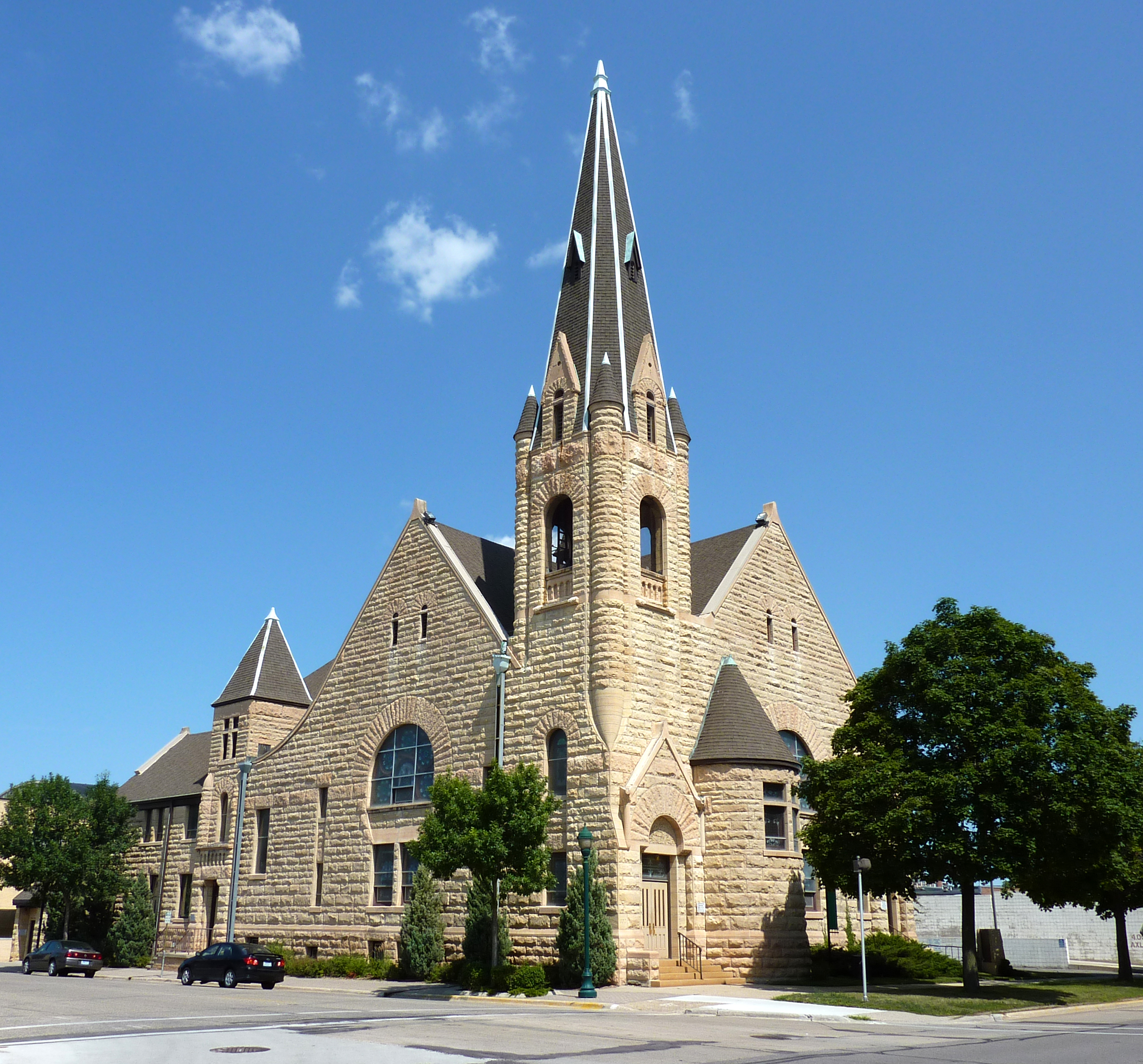

- Location within Minnesota Location within the United States
- Location: 220 E Hickory St., Mankato, Minnesota
- Coordinates: 44°9′53″N 94°0′7″W
- Area: less than one acre
- Built: 1893
- Architect: Warren H. Hayes
- Architectural style: Richardsonian Romanesque
- MPS: Blue Earth County MRA
- NRHP reference No.: 80001946
- Added to NRHP: July 28, 1980

The First Presbyterian Church is a historic church in Mankato, Minnesota. It is a Richardsonian Romanesque-style building designed by Warren H. Hayes. It was listed on the National Register of Historic Places in 1980.

The congregation was founded in 1855, three years after the town of Mankato was first platted. The first church building was a log schoolhouse, and the second building was built in 1865. Construction on the current building started in 1893, with the sanctuary completed in 1896.
