= Blue Earth County History Center =

Museum in Mankato, Minnesota

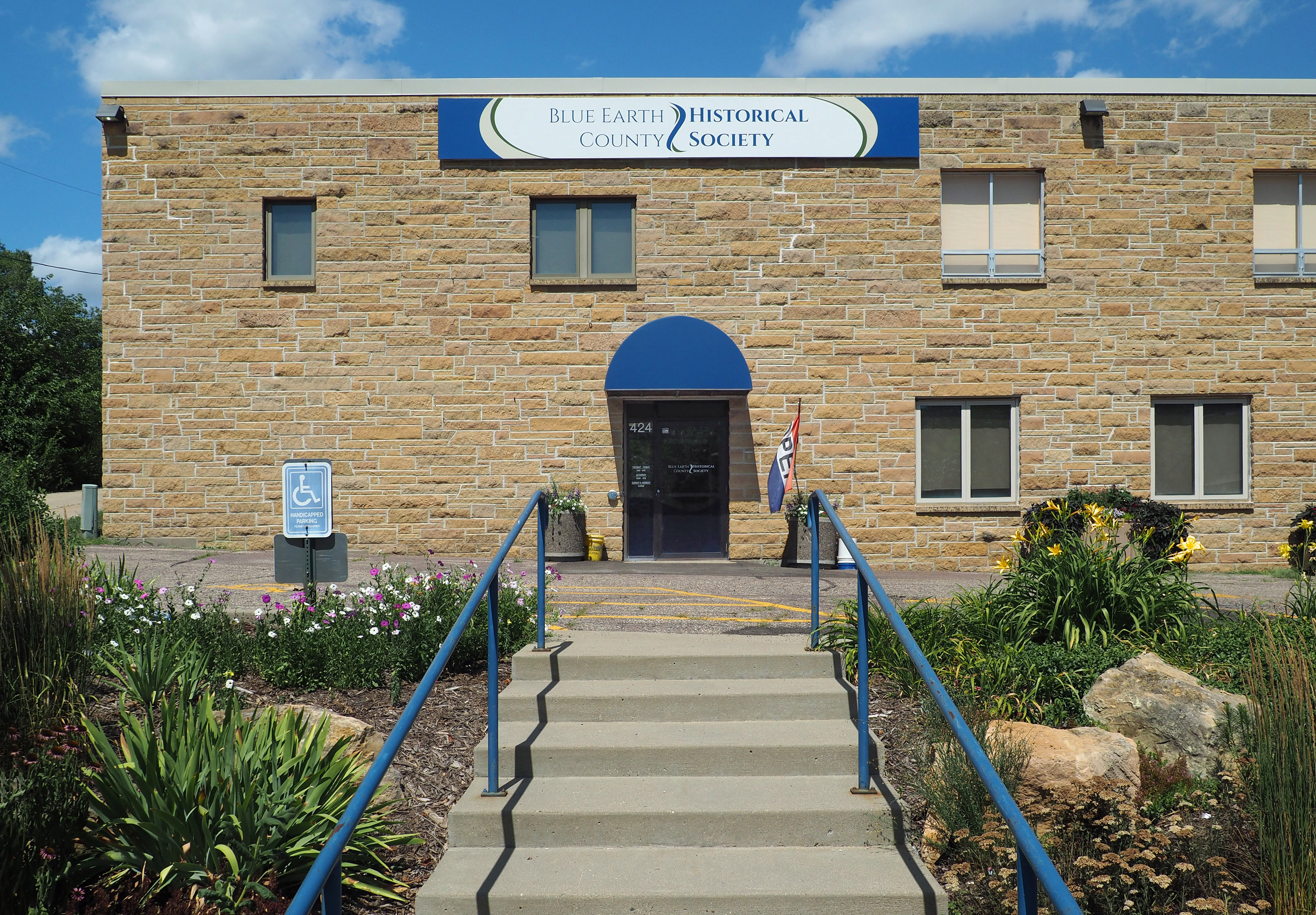
- Entrance
- Established: 1988
- Location: 424 Warren Street, Mankato, Minnesota, United States
- Coordinates: 44.1608°N 94.0020°W
- Type: Local History
- Executive director: Jessica Potter
- Website: blueearthcountyhistory.com

The Blue Earth County History Center is a museum library and archives owned and operated by the Blue Earth County Historical Society. It is a repository of photographs, printed materials and artifacts related to the history of the south central Minnesota county of Blue Earth. The History Center offers interactive exhibits for children, traditional exhibits, and the Marian Anderson Art Gallery. A research center is accessible for researchers and genealogists, providing resources such as a comprehensive obituary index, cemetery transcriptions, subject and surname files, and microfilmed newspapers.

== Blue Earth County Historical Society ==
The History Center functions as the current headquarters of the non-profit organization established in 1901 and is one of the oldest historical societies in Minnesota. It is dedicated to the preservation and dissemination of Blue Earth County's history.

In 1938, BECHS acquired the R.D. Hubbard House with funding from a neighbor, Judge Loren Cray, to establish a permanent museum location.

The City of Mankato took over ownership of the house, agreeing to maintain it for the Society to operate as a museum. As the Society expanded, it placed historical markers throughout the county and advocated for the inclusion of significant sites on the national register.

The Society expanded beyond the Hubbard House and in 1988 relocated to the former Catholic Newman Center at 424 Warren Street, sharing the space with another non-profit organization. Later the Society took over the entire building space. The upstairs hallway now serves as an additional space for showcasing photo exhibits. The reorganization of the upstairs exhibit complemented the new entrance created when the gift shop was relocated downstairs.

The Society's executive director, Jessica Potter, was hired in 2001 as their curator and archivist.

== Programs ==
They offer in-person and virtual programs, a monthly Talking Ancestors Group, an annual Halloween 'Ghosts from the Past' event, and Historic pub crawls.

== Gallery ==
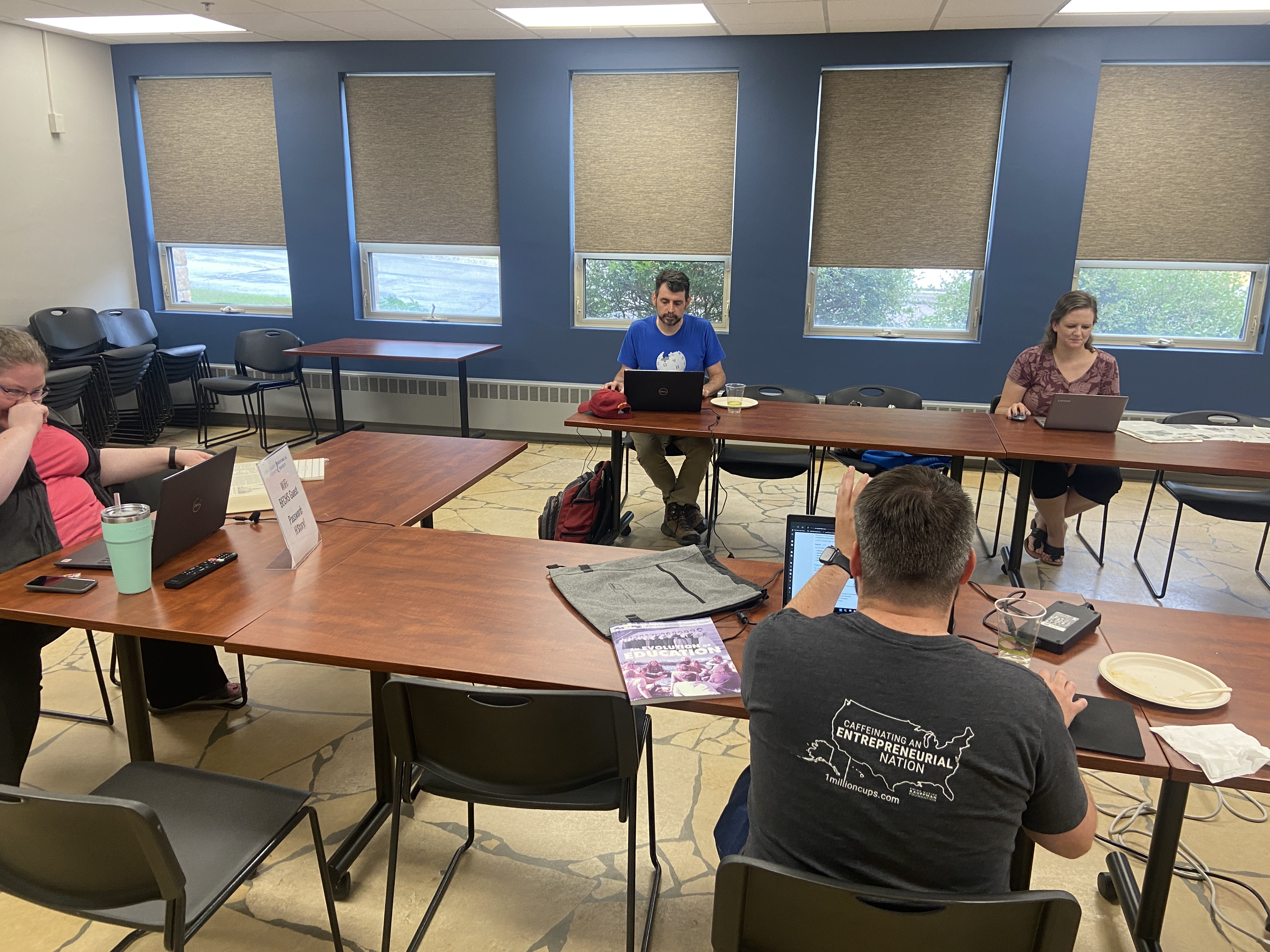
2022 Wikipedia Local History Edit-a-thon

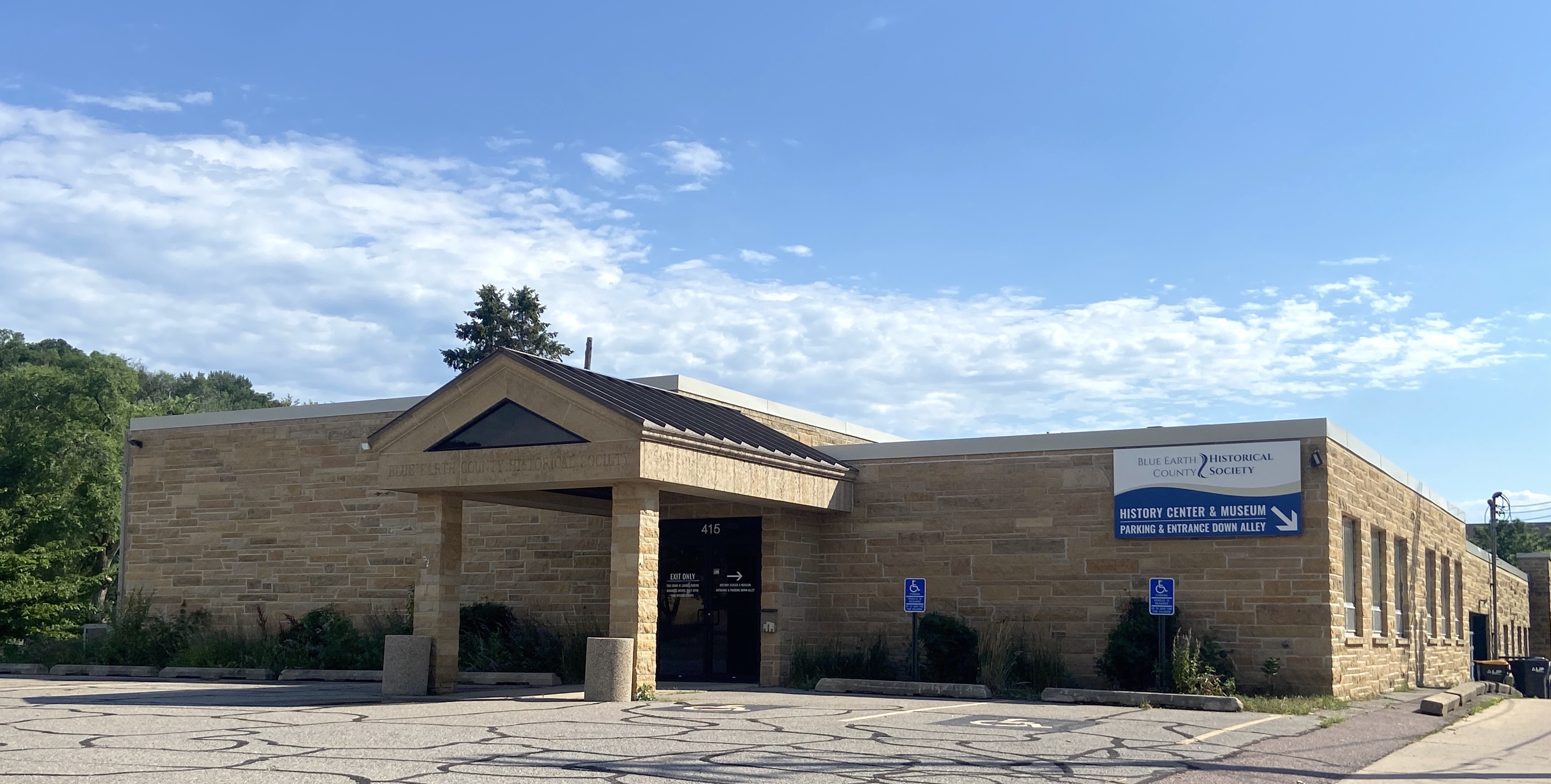
Back entrance

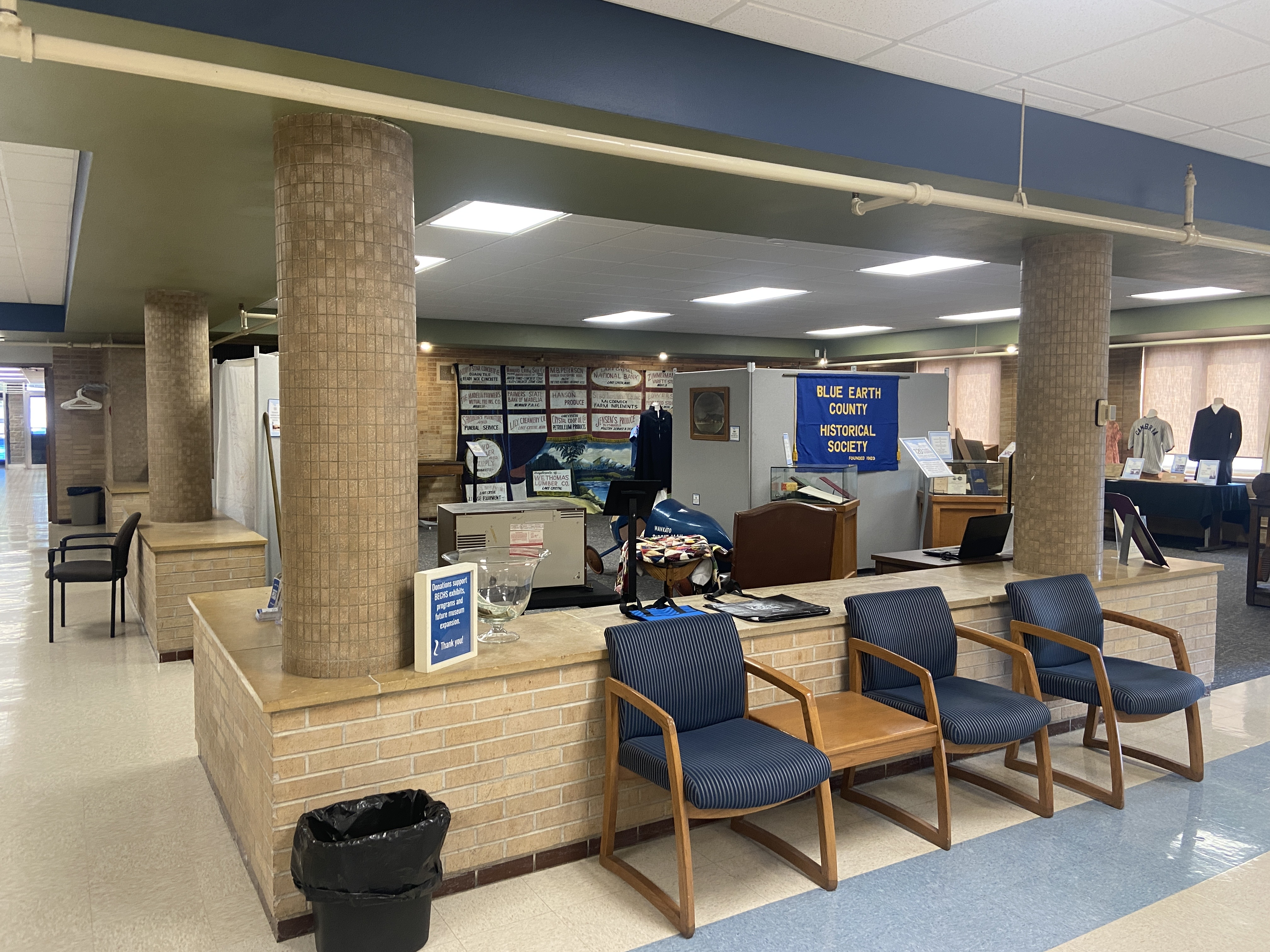
Interior space at front entrance

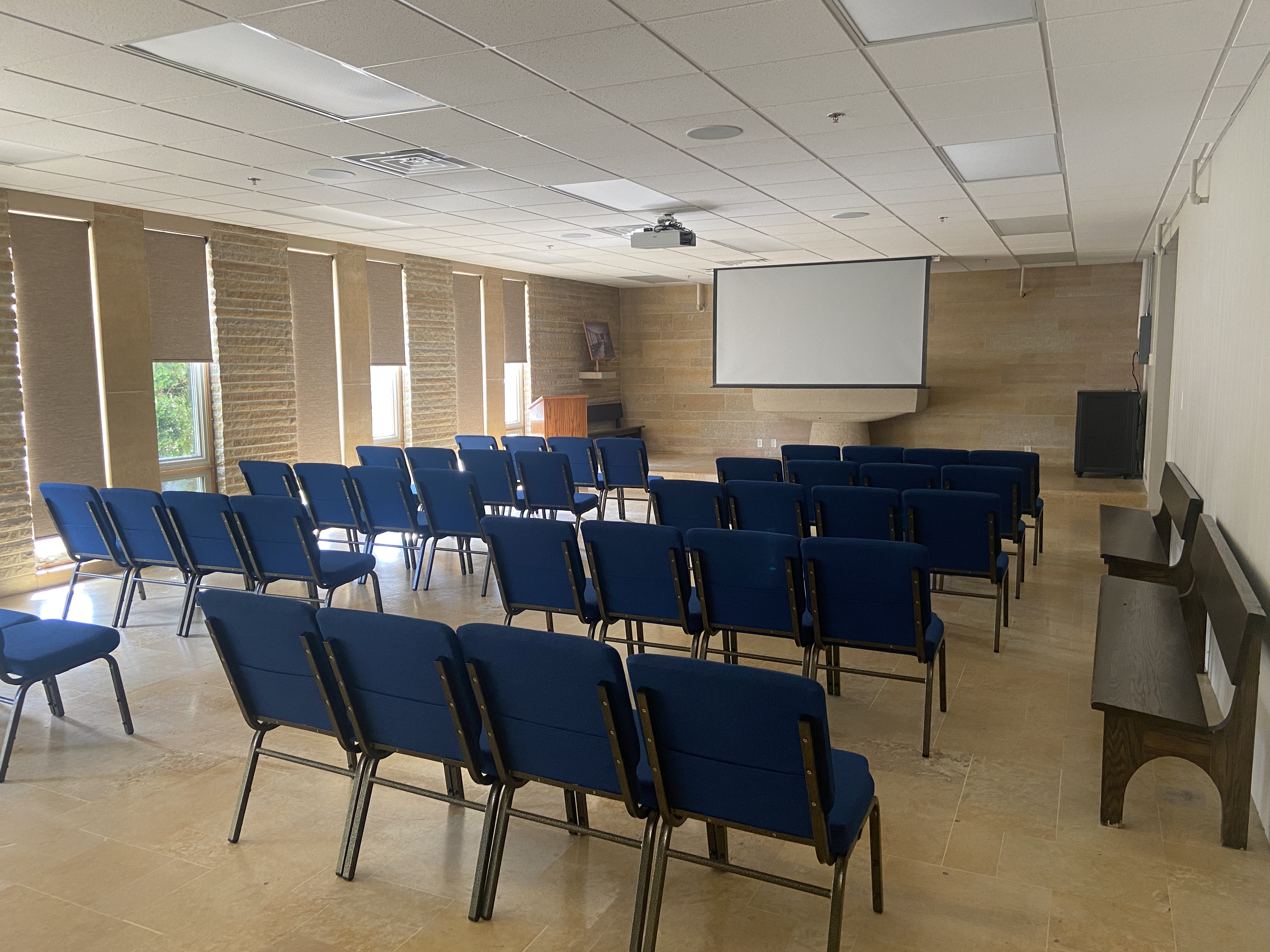
Meeting room

== See also ==
- List of museums in Minnesota
