= Rensselaer D. Hubbard House =

Historic house in Minnesota, United States

- U.S. National Register of Historic Places
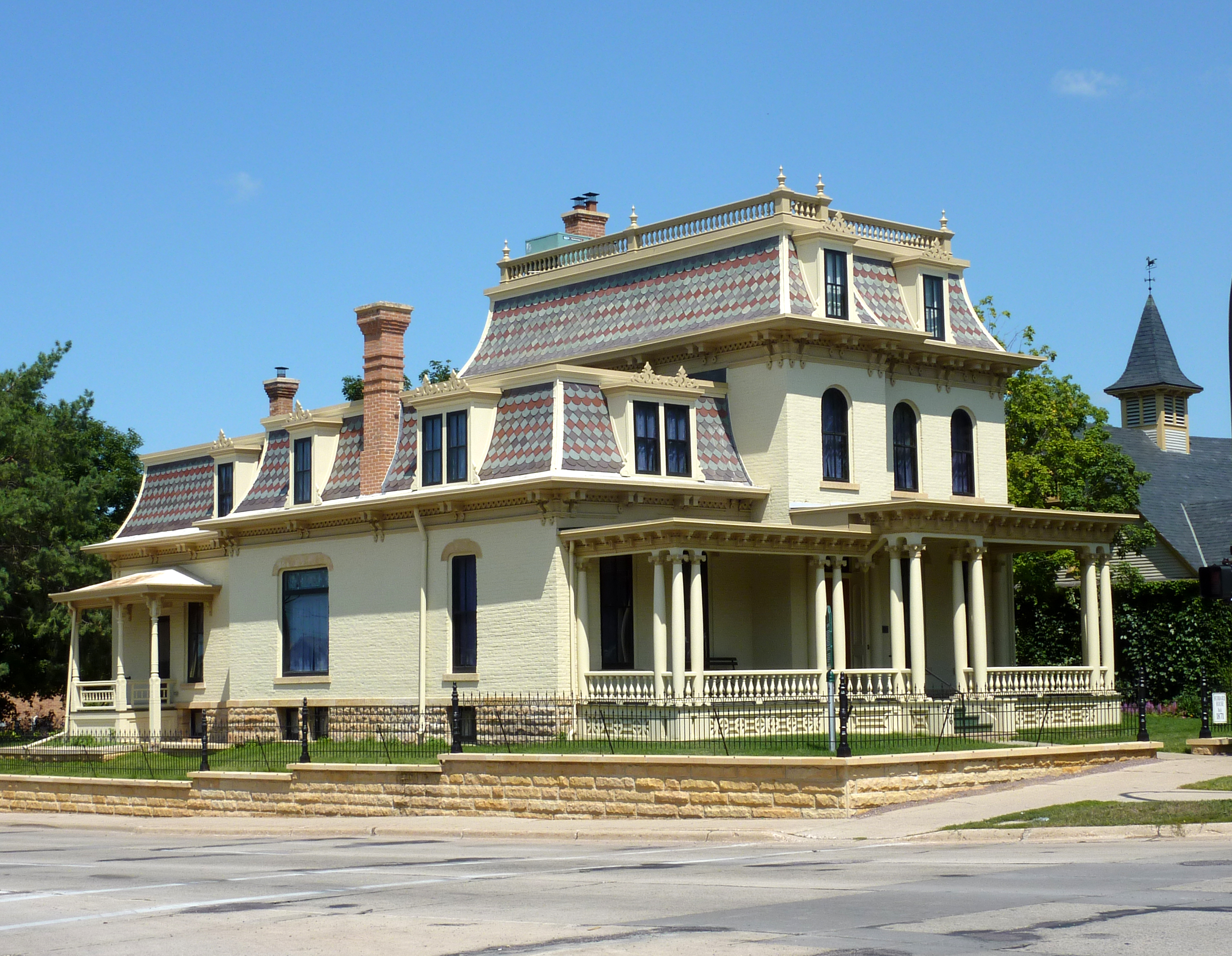

- Location within Minnesota Location within the United States
- Interactive map showing the location of Hubbard House
- Location: 606 S. Broad Street, Mankato, Minnesota
- Coordinates: 44°9′41″N 94°0′18″W
- Built: 1871
- Architect: Barnard, Silas
- Architectural style: Second Empire
- MPS: Blue Earth County MRA (AD)
- NRHP reference No.: 76001047
- Added to NRHP: June 07, 1976

The Rensselaer D. Hubbard House, (also known as the Hubbard House) is a historic house in Mankato, Minnesota, United States. Originally a 16-room private home, it is currently a museum. It the first private residence in Mankato to have indoor plumbing, electricity and a telephone. The building was placed on the National Register of Historic Places on June 7, 1976.

The house was built in 1871 for Rensselaer D. Hubbard, a successful businessman. It was designed by Silas Barnard in the French Second Empire style.

== History ==
=== Rensselaer D. Hubbard ===
Hubbard was born in Oswego County, New York, on December 14, 1837, to a family of farmers, formerly of Connecticut, with roots dating back to Colonial America. He had limited education, and left home at age 15 to work on a survey crew for the Albany and Susquehanna Railroad. In 1851, he moved to California and worked on a farm in the Sacramento Valley. From 1857 to 1858 he tried gold mining around the Humboldt River in Nevada and Fraser River in British Columbia, Canada. He moved back to New York in 1859, where he worked as a grocery clerk making $50 per month and was quickly promoted to manager at a salary of $160 per month.

During the Civil War, he tried to enlist in the Union Army in January 1863 but was rendered unfit for military service due to a severe attack of pneumonia. He then began farming tobacco in Sidney, New York for a few years, during which time he married Mary Esther Cook. The two moved to Corry, Pennsylvania, in 1866 as he reentered the grocery business, this time with great success: starting with capital of $2000, he earned approximately $30,000 in four years. He then moved back to California in 1870 with plans of starting a bank, but due to an ongoing recession was unable to find favorable conditions. Hubbard then decided to move to Mankato.

Hubbard built a warehouse in Mankato and worked in the wheat market until March 1872. At that time he entered a partnership that started the Mankato Linseed Oil Company, of which he was manager for 11 years; after initial struggles the company found success. In 1878, he founded the Mankato Milling Company and served as its president until his death in 1905. The company became a major flour milling operation in the late 19th century and early 20th century, and changed names to the R.D. Hubbard & Company, then to the R.D. Hubbard Milling Company in 1894, and finally the Hubbard Milling Company in 1897. With partner George Palmer, he established a system of 42 grain elevators stretching across southern Minnesota and into South Dakota. The Hubbard Milling Company later expanded into livestock feed, pet food, and specialized feed products and still exists today as a subsidiary of the Canadian company Ridley.

Hubbard's first wife died on April 21, 1877; the two had one son. He married again in 1878 to Miss Frank Griffith, and had two daughters. The youngest daughter, Mary Ester Hubbard, sold the home to the Blue Earth County Historical Society in 1938.

=== House ===
The Hubbard House's location on South Broad Street was once part of Mankato's "silk stocking district", which included a number of Victorian era mansions. Built on a basement of cut stone, the structure used brick and wood with Mankato stone trim details. The home was built in two sections: The original section of the main house, built in 1871, is two and a half stories with a mansard roof of colored slate. The 1888 addition is one and a half stories and is telescoped in the Italianate style. The structure features a front porch with Ionic columns.

In 1897, Judge Loren Cray built a large mansion, the Cray Mansion, abutting the Hubbard House property. For several years the two owners engaged in a game of one-upmanship in upgrading their properties; the battle appeared to end when Cray added a top-floor ballroom. Both houses are listed on the NRHP. The Hubbard House was completely redecorated in 1905; members of the family lived in the home and made changes until 1938.

After the Blue Earth County Historical Society purchased the home in 1938, they deeded the property to the City of Mankato, which in turn assumed all maintenance costs and allowed the society to operate the museum and maintain the antiques within. The society used the house as its main museum from 1938 to 1988; during that time the home housed exhibit galleries, artifact storage, offices and a research center. A two-story, brick Queen Anne Style carriage house built in 1890 was moved to the site in 1977. Once the society moved to his new headquarters, it opted to restructure the house museum to interpret the life of the Hubbard family; as such the home was restored to its 1905 state.

In May 2009, the Historical Society completed the twenty year restoration project on the structure, bringing it back to its 1905 appearance. The final phase restored the main porch and refurbished the 56 wooden storm windows. The project was funded by the Minnesota Historical Society, City of Mankato, private donors and fundraising.

== Interior ==
The house has 16 rooms. The Hubbards emphasized beauty and utility in the house's design. When the original section was built in 1871, it included a central heating system (furnace); the structure also included four bathrooms, uncommon in the area at the time. The home was also one of the first in the area to have indoor plumbing, a telephone, and electricity. Hubbard was unsure whether electricity would become standard, so he installed lights that operated on both gas and electrical power.

The three fireplaces on the first floor use a combination of Georgian, Spanish and Italian marbles as well as Brazilian onyx. The library featured cotton wall coverings, and the parlor featured silk damask wall coverings imported from Paris. The grand staircase is made of oak, and was part of the 1888 expansion replacing an iron spiral staircase. A Tiffany chandelier hangs over the dining room table.

== Current use ==
The home has operated as a museum by the Blue Earth County Historical Society and is open to the public for a fee. The house contains approximately a quarter of the Hubbard family's original furniture, with remaining antique furnishings donated by patrons of the museum. A significant portion of the wall paper was replaced by replicas. Fourteen of the original rooms are part of the museum. The carriage house contains a display of horse-drawn vehicles and antique automobiles and a 1916 fire engine. The period gardens around the house and grounds are maintained by the volunteer Twilight Garden Club.
