= Mary Naylor =

British-American entertainer (born 1926)

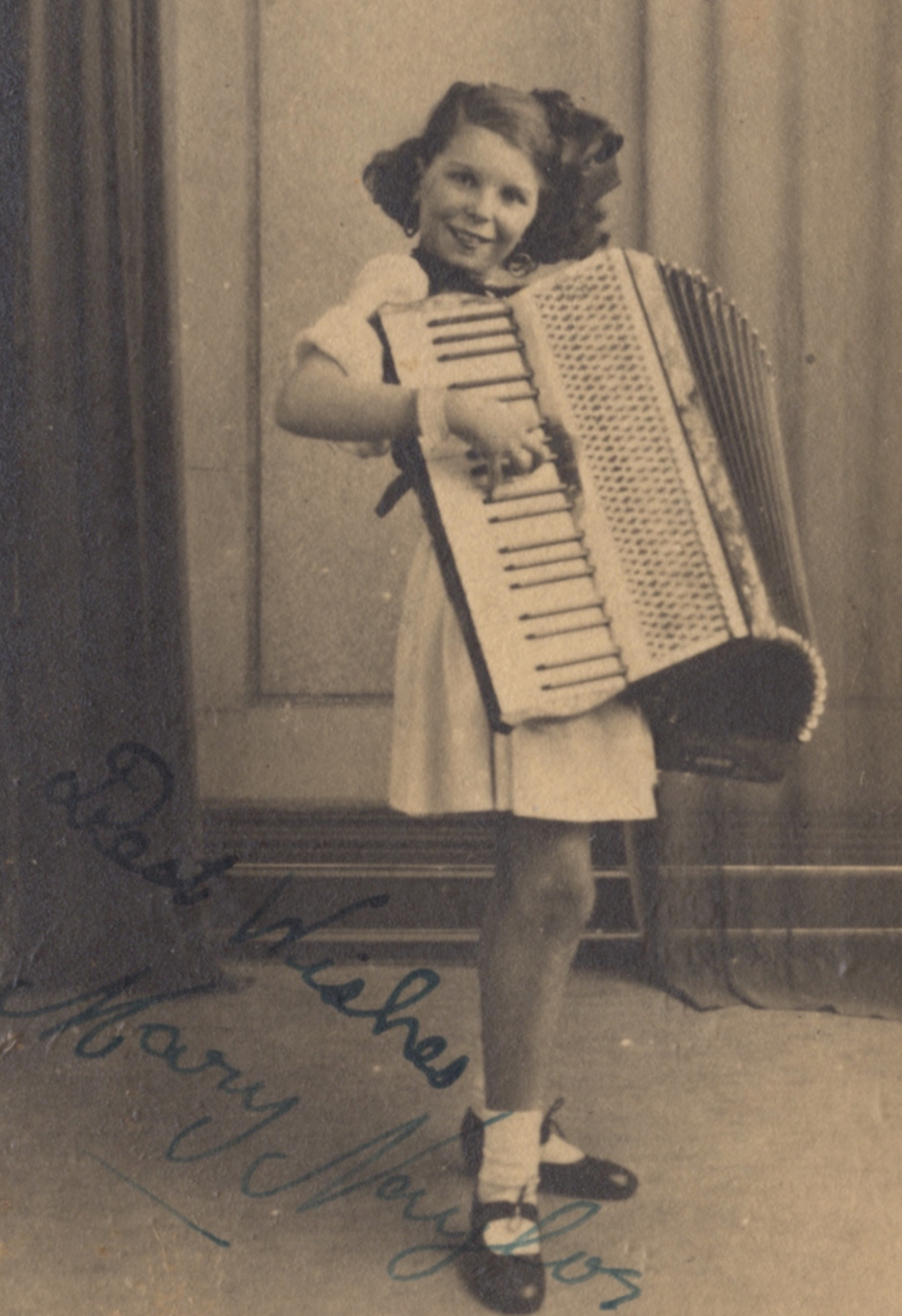
- Born: Florence Mary Naylor; 2 April 1926 (age 100); Carlton, Nottinghamshire, England
- Occupations: Singer, actor, entertainer
- Years active: 1938–1962
- Height: 5' 1.5"
- Spouse: Jack Kodell (m. 1953; died 2012)

Florence Mary Naylor (born 2 April 1926) is a British-American retired variety entertainer, known for her work as a West End leading lady, radio and television celebrity, singer, pianist, and accordionist. She starred in the opening production number for the 1946 Royal Variety Performance, and was a child star in the Youth Takes A Bow troupe that toured England, Wales and Scotland during the first two years of World War II with Ernie Wise and Eric Morecambe.

== Early life ==
Florence Mary Naylor was born on 2 April 1926 in Carlton, Nottingham, England, to Cyril Naylor and Hannah Naylor (née Robinson), both of Nottingham. She was the eldest of three children and had a younger sister, Margaret, and a younger brother, Ernest.

Naylor began singing as a child while helping her parents sell fruit and vegetables in open markets across the Midlands, often standing on an orange crate to attract customers.

She attended Standhill Infant School for five years before continuing at Porchester Senior School. Because of her early performing career, much of her schooling was completed while touring.

Naylor began piano lessons in 1933 on her seventh birthday and started learning the accordion two years later. At age 11, she was awarded the gold medal in the Senior Grade Piano Examination.

Between 1936 and 1938, Naylor performed with her siblings in Nottingham's Madame Haine's Accordion Band. During this period she also appeared as a solo performer between films at Nottingham cinemas, performed in dance halls with Ernie Lotinga and his orchestra, and appeared at Nig-Nog Concert fundraising events.

== Early professional career ==
=== Discovery and first London appearances (1938–1939) ===
Naylor began performing professionally at the age of twelve, when the comedian and show runner Ernie Lotinga brought her to London after noticing her talent. In August and September 1938 she appeared for three weeks at the Hackney Empire in the revue King of Polonia, her first engagement on a major London stage.

Naylor's early career unfolded during the final months of peace before the outbreak of the Second World War. In early March 1939 she auditioned in Nottingham for the orchestra leader and impresario Jack Hylton while he was passing through the city. Within three days she had been brought to London to appear in the variety programme Monday Night at Eight in a segment titled Youth Takes a Bow.

While working with Hylton's company, Naylor made her first BBC broadcasts. On 13 March 1939 she appeared on BBC radio on the programme Monday Night at Seven, performing with Jack Hylton's band. Later that same week she made her BBC Television debut, appearing on 15 March and again on 17 March, where she sang and played both piano and accordion. These appearances made her the first, and youngest, performer from Nottingham to appear on television and the first artist from the city to appear twice on the BBC within a single week. Other young performers in the Youth Takes a Bow cast included the Henderson Twins, Dick Henderson Jr., and Ernie Wise.

Soon afterward Naylor joined Sid Walker, known for the radio series Band Waggon, on the touring stage production Mr. Walker Wants to Know. Performing across the Moss Empires theatre circuit, one of Britain's principal networks of variety theatres, she gained experience before large national audiences at a remarkably young age.

On 3 July 1939 Naylor appeared at the London Palladium in the stage version of the popular radio programme Band Waggon. The engagement ended abruptly when Britain declared war on Germany on 3 September 1939. Theatres across the United Kingdom closed temporarily, and when they reopened wartime restrictions prevented child performers from appearing on the London stage.

After London theatres closed to young performers, Naylor continued working elsewhere during the autumn of 1939 and early 1940. She appeared on BBC Home Service and Special Forces broadcasts, performed for Midland cinema circuits, and worked with touring big band ensembles such as Billy Merrin and his Commanders. She also took part in numerous wartime fundraising concerts and charity events.

=== Youth Takes a Bow and wartime touring (1940–1941) ===
By the first week of February, 1940, Naylor again was touring with a newly revised version of the "Youth Takes A Bow" group on the Moss Empire circuit, this time chaperoned by her father, Cyril "Pops" Naylor. Most times the show was under the banner, "Youth Takes A Bow" during 1940, and then "Secrets of the BBC" during 1941 since most of the cast, including its young stars, were regular favorites on British radio.

The touring troupe was hosted by stage master of ceremonies Bryan Michie. Among its regular performers were future entertainers Ernie Wise and Eric Morecambe.

The "Youth Takes A Bow" company worked almost every week from early 1940 onwards in all the major cities of England, Scotland, and Wales. The destruction of London during the German Blitz bombings in mid-October, 1940 forced the troupe to perform mostly outside of London, but they returned again after the worst of the bombing stopped. The children (ages 12–17) were told by management that if the bombs started to fall after the curtain had risen, they were to keep their acts going because it was safer at that point to have the audience stay in the theatre rather than risk flying debris outside. They were bombed themselves, most notably in Swansea, South Wales, on September 1, 1940, and in Chatham on October 5, 1940. The troupe of youngsters was booked for 50–52 weeks per year, and they were rarely sent home for a week except when the theatre they were supposed to play at was bombed (such as in March 1941).In addition to doing 7-18 performances per week, Naylor, and many of her child-star cast-mates performed on radio, in special concerts, for charity events, fund-raising causes (including the Million Cigarettes Scheme), for military gatherings, and even visited soldiers at camps and hospitals all over Great Britain. Naylor, and the "Youth Takes a Bow" troupe, became a beloved part of the Entertainment industry during World War II.

The "Youth Takes A Bow" segment was usually positioned in the second act of the show, with the first act consisting of big name professionals like Alice and Rosie Lloyd, Adelaide Hall, Tessie O'Shea, June Marlow, The Danny Lipton Trio, Archie Glen, George Moon & Dick Bentley, Dickie "Large Lumps" Hassett, The Iizuka Brothers, The Donna Sisters, Archie Glen, Scott Saunders, and more. Sometimes the first act went under the title of "Secrets of the BBC," since most of the entire bill, including Naylor and most of the other kids, performed regularly on BBC radio. At other times, the YTAB troupe would be incorporated for a week here and there in Jack Warner's stage version of his famous wartime show, Garrison Theatre, filling in playing various parts. At other times, the YTAB troupe completed the bill with big bands like Nat Gonella & his New Georgians.

=== Breakthrough roles and wartime popularity (1942–1946) ===
In April 1942, just after her 16th birthday, Naylor left the “Youth Takes A Bow” company, for the breakout ingénue role in “Scoop” at the London’s West End Vaudeville Theatre. In September of that year, she left the cast of “Scoop” to play the part of Vera Hasset in the film, "The Man in Grey" with Margaret Lockwood, James Mason, and Stewart Granger. After the movie, Naylor returned to the stage starring in George Black's “Best Bib and Tucker” at the London Palladium with Tommy Trinder. During the run of this show, Naylor became involved with the Merchant Seamen's Fund and the Merchant Radio program, "Shipmates Ashore," making weekly contributions throughout the remainder of the war, partly because her old co-star, Ernie Wise, had come off the stage and was now in the Merchant Navy. Mary’s work with this branch of the services garnered her the title, “Sweetheart of the Merchant Navy.” While Naylor was in "Best Bib and Tucker" at the London Palladium, she would pay weekly visits to Grinstead Hospital for Burned Airmen to meet with "the boys" individually and sing for them in her RAF-style show costume. At the time, she was 16/17, about the same age as the youngest men. Naylor was then voted a "Pin-Up Girl of the RAF." Throughout all the war years, Naylor volunteered at fund raising events, lending her talents to help the troupes and all the people of Great Britain.

After “Best Bib and Tucker” ended its 10-month long run at the Palladium Theatre, the play continued as a road show (now called: "Palladium Comes to Camp") playing on stages and military bases on and off until the end of 1943 under the auspices of the General War Theatre Council. From that point on, Ms. Naylor was featured in variety shows, reviews, radio, cabaret, charity events, and concerts in London and every major British city, returning to various Panto shows each holiday season. In November 1946, she was the opening act for the first Royal Command Variety Performance at the Palladium, singing "Turn Off The Rain." Her performance earned her the nickname from the Queen (later called the "Queen Mother") as "The Typical England's Rose."

== Adult career ==
After the Second World War, Naylor continued her career as a singer on stage and radio, performing both as a solo artist and in duets with Sam Browne.

From the late 1940s to 1962, she was a regular presence in British variety theatre, working as a leading lady across major circuits including the West End, Stoll Theatres, and Moss Empires. Her performances spanned variety shows, reviews, cabaret, pantomime, and ice productions.

She also maintained a steady presence on British radio from the late 1930s, appearing in numerous BBC programmes. She performed with entertainers including Ernie Wise and Eric Morecambe, and co-starred with Ralph Reader in "It's Great To Be Young" (1948–49).

As television developed in Britain, Naylor appeared in a range of early programmes. She starred in the BBC series "I'm a Friend of Mary's" (1950–51) and later headlined a fortnightly Sunday night variety show in 1958. Although she appeared regularly on television, she did not establish a long-running series built around her.

In the late 1950s, she expanded her career to the United States, performing in variety productions including "A Maid in America" and appearing in shows in Las Vegas.

Alongside her stage and broadcast work, Naylor was active in entertaining servicemen. From 1942, she performed at the Stage Door Canteen in London, including its final performance in 1947, and later toured with the Entertainments National Service Association (ENSA), entertaining British troops in Germany.

From 1947, she was a member of the Grand Order of Lady Ratlings, the female branch of a professional association for variety entertainers.

== Personal life ==
Naylor married the American stage magician Jack Kodell on 7 March 1953, at the age of 26, at Caxton Hall Register Office in Westminster, London. The entertainer Tessie O'Shea, with whom Naylor had previously worked, served as matron of honour.

Following their marriage, Naylor continued her career while also appearing with Kodell in a joint variety act that combined her singing and musicianship with his stage illusions. In 1960, at the age of 34, Naylor emigrated permanently to the United States with her husband, where they developed full-scale entertainment programmes for transatlantic passenger ships, contributing to the emergence of modern cruise-ship entertainment.

After retiring from performance, Naylor and Kodell settled in Orlando, Florida. She remained active within the entertainment community, mentoring younger performers. She had no children and was widowed in 2012 after nearly six decades of marriage. Naylor later continued to participate in lectures and mentorship activities.

== Selected shows ==
=== West End and major London stage productions ===
- Band Waggon (1939), London Palladium
- Best Bib and Tucker (1942–43), London Palladium
- Champagne on Ice (1953), London Palladium
- Scoop (1942), London Palladium
- Strike a New Note (1943), Prince of Wales Theatre, West End

=== Touring revues and variety productions ===
- Hip, Hip Hooray (1945), New Opera House, Blackpool, then tour
- Jewel & Warriss with Mary Naylor (1944), Blackpool Palace, Blackpool
- Maid in America (1956), Terrace Room at the Morrison Hotel, Chicago, IL USA and on tour
- Monday Night at Seven (1939), London, various theatres
- Mr. Walker Wants To Know (1939), touring show
- On With The Show (1944), North Pier Theatre, Blackpool
- Out of the Blue (1947), Grand Theatre, Blackpool
- Sam Browne and Mary Naylor Road Show (1949), various
- Turn On the Rainbow (1947), Empire, Liverpool
- Youth Takes a Bow (1939–1942), touring show

=== Pantomime roles ===
- Aladdin (1947), New Theatre, Oxford
- Babes in the Wood (1957), Hulme Hippodrome
- Dick Whittington (1943), Aston Hippodrome, Birmingham
- Goldilocks and the Three Bears (1943), Edinburgh, Scotland
- Goody Two Shoes (1952), Royal, Hanley
- Humpty Dumpty (1945), Palace Theatre, Manchester
- Puss in Boots (1950), Opera House, Belfast, Northern Ireland
- Puss in Boots (1951), Empire, Leeds
- Robin Hood (1957–58)
- Robinson Crusoe (1948), Hippodrome, Preston

=== Variety circuit and notable engagements ===
- King of Polonia (1938), Empire, Hackney, London
- Moss Empires variety tour with Sam Browne (1946–1956)
- Royal Variety Performance (1946), London Palladium
