= Lorin Cray House =

Historic house in Minnesota, United States

- U.S. National Register of Historic Places
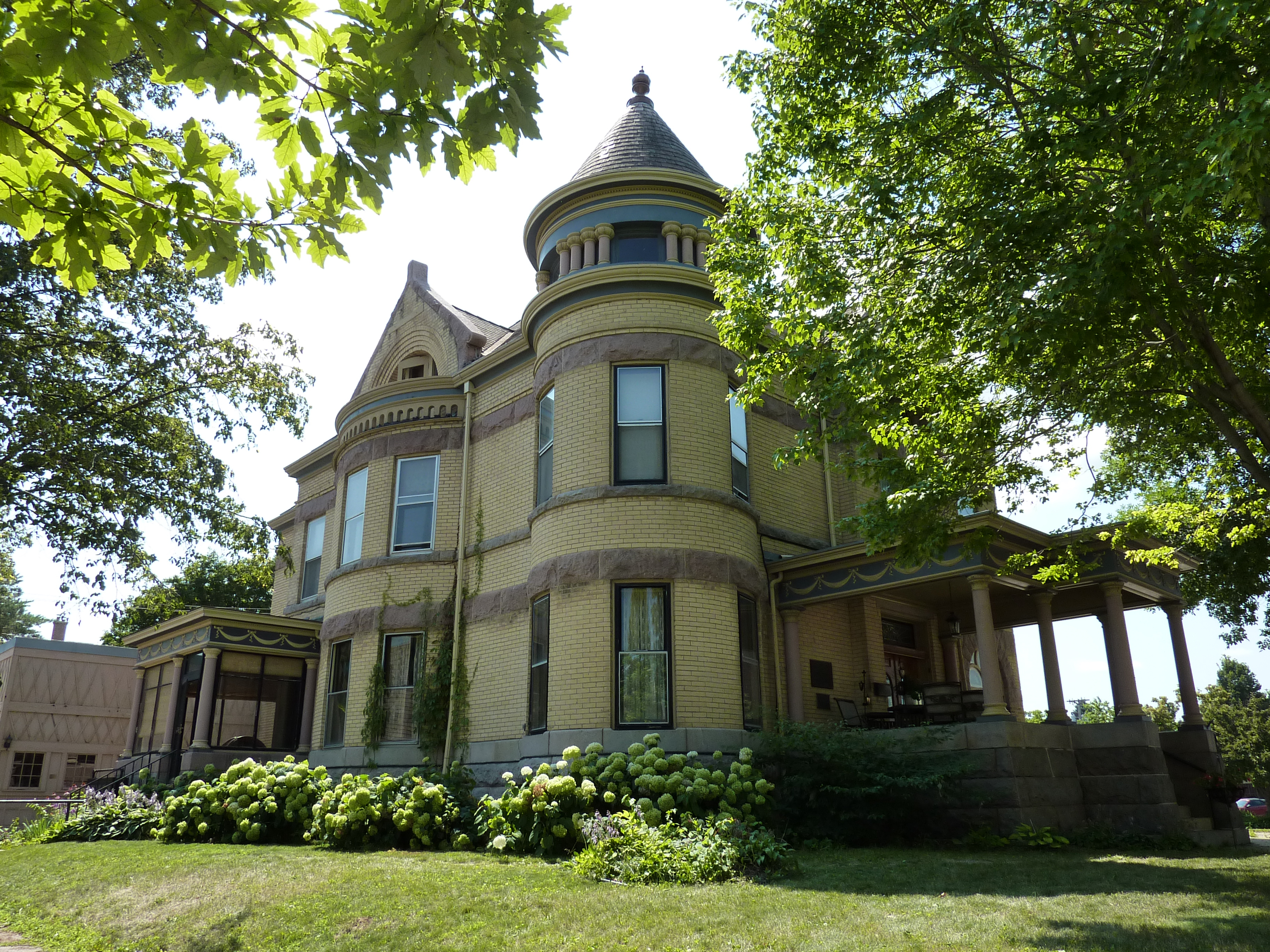

- Location within Minnesota Location within the United States
- Location: 603 S. 2nd Street, Mankato, Minnesota
- Coordinates: 44°9′43″N 94°0′20″W
- Area: less than one acre
- Built: 1897
- Architect: Thayer, Frank
- Architectural style: Classical Revival, Queen Anne, Romanesque
- MPS: Blue Earth County MRA
- NRHP reference No.: 80001943
- Added to NRHP: July 28, 1980

The Lorin Cray House (also known as the Cray Mansion) is a historic structure in Mankato, Minnesota. Originally a private home, it was owned by the local YWCA for just over 80 years, from late 1927 until they changed locations in early 2008. It was added to the National Register of Historic Places on July 28, 1980.

== Description and history ==
The Queen Anne Style brick residence was designed by Frank Thayer for Lorin P. Cray, a civic leader, judge and philanthropist. Built in 1897 at a cost of $13,000, the house is constructed of buff brick, red brick, pink granite and Kasota limestone. It features towers, porch, columns, side balcony and stained, etched and beveled glass windows typical of the period. The property once included a carriage house, which was demolished to make room for a YWCA annex. The house is approximately 10,000 square feet (930 m^{2}).

Built adjacent to the equally lavish Renesselaer D. Hubbard House, for several years the two owners engaged in a game of one-upmanship in upgrading their properties; the battle appeared to end when Cray added a top-floor ballroom. Both houses are listed on the NRHP.

Cray was an important donor to what became the Mankato YWCA; when he and his wife died in 1927, the house and furnishings were willed to the organization along with an endowment for the upkeep of the building. The organization moved into the structure on November 12, 1927, using it initially as a communal house. The second floor housed at least eight girls until 1952. The building was converted into the YWCA's offices as well as a preschool. The organization moved out in 2008; the move was prompted by expensive maintenance costs for the historic building.

The YWCA put the structure up for sale in 2006 for $682,400. The Mankato Area Foundation showed serious interest in purchasing the house for the city, but terms that would have allowed the YWCA to occupy the building with no other tenants for up to ten years while the city paid upkeep of $50,000 a year killed the deal. When it became clear the structure would likely fall into private hands, historic preservationists, led by the Blue Earth County Historical Society, expressed concerns that the building might be significantly altered. The building sold on February 28, 2008, for $505,000; at the time its appraised value was $675,000. The buyer, a private developer, proposed to use the first floor as shared space and rent the rest as communal housing; however city ordinances prohibited a single unit from housing more than five unrelated people. The building is now a multi-dwelling structure.

After the sale of the Cray Mansion, the City of Mankato created the Heritage Preservation Commission, an official commission that can designate properties as historic and control what can and cannot be done to their exteriors.
