= Happy Chef =

Restaurant in Minnesota, United States

Happy Chef Systems
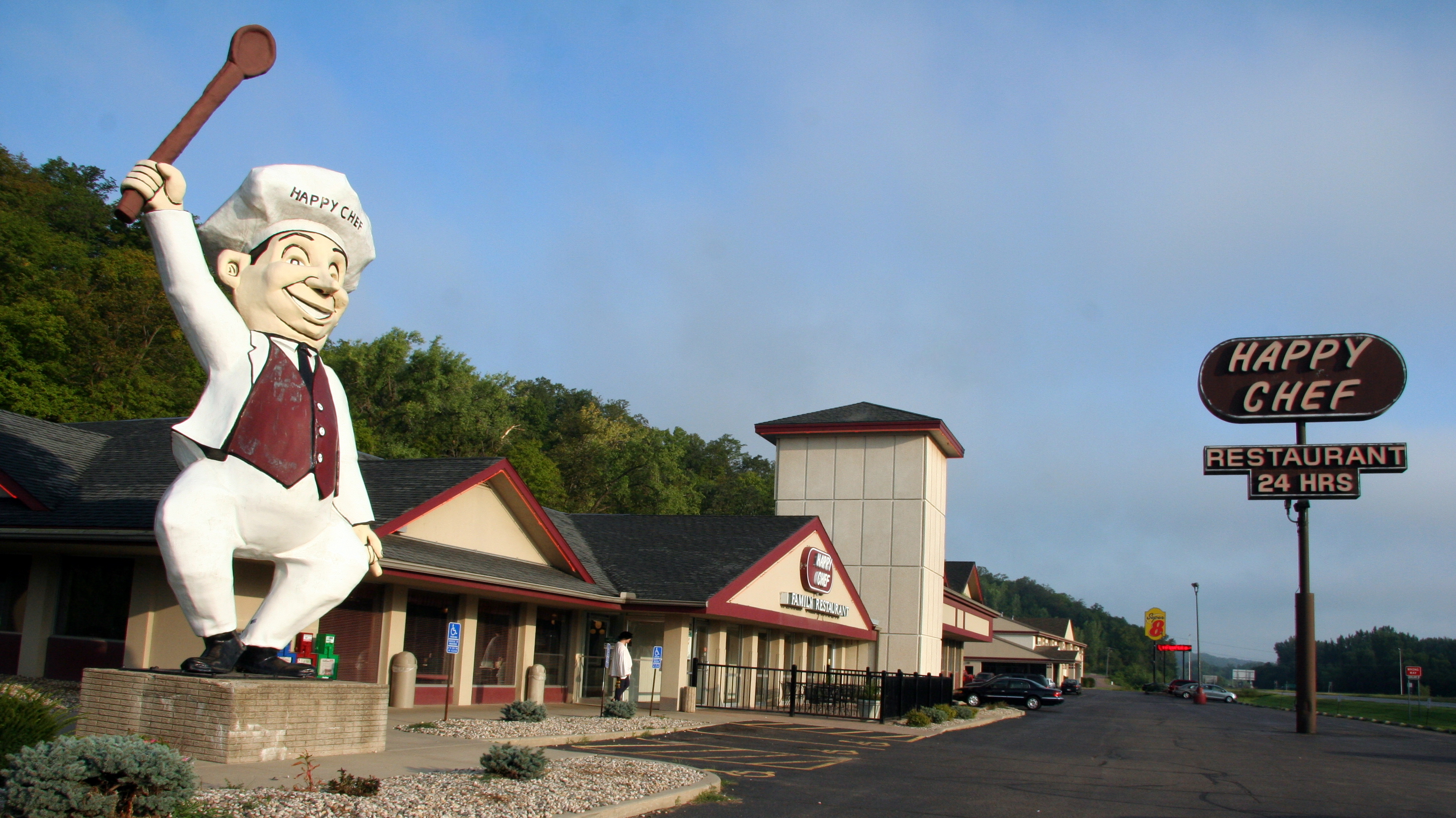
- Industry: Casual dining
- Founded: Mankato, Minnesota, U.S. (1963)
- Headquarters: Mankato, Minnesota, U.S.,

Happy Chef is a casual dining restaurant in Mankato, Minnesota. It is known for serving breakfast throughout the day and is similar to Denny's, Perkins, and IHOP.

== History ==
The first Happy Chef Restaurant opened in 1963 in Mankato. The chain eventually grew to 65 restaurants across the Midwest, employing nearly 3,000 people. However, as consumers increasingly patronized competitors and tastes changed to favor restaurants that offered alcohol and televisions, Happy Chef's owner leased or sold off all the restaurants but one—the original location in Mankato, which still operates today.

== Other Concepts ==
Another concept operated by Happy Chef was Ruttles 50s Bar & Grill Restaurants.
