= 1862 Mankato mass execution =

Hanging of 38 Dakota men by the United States government

- Part of aftermath of the 1862 Dakota War
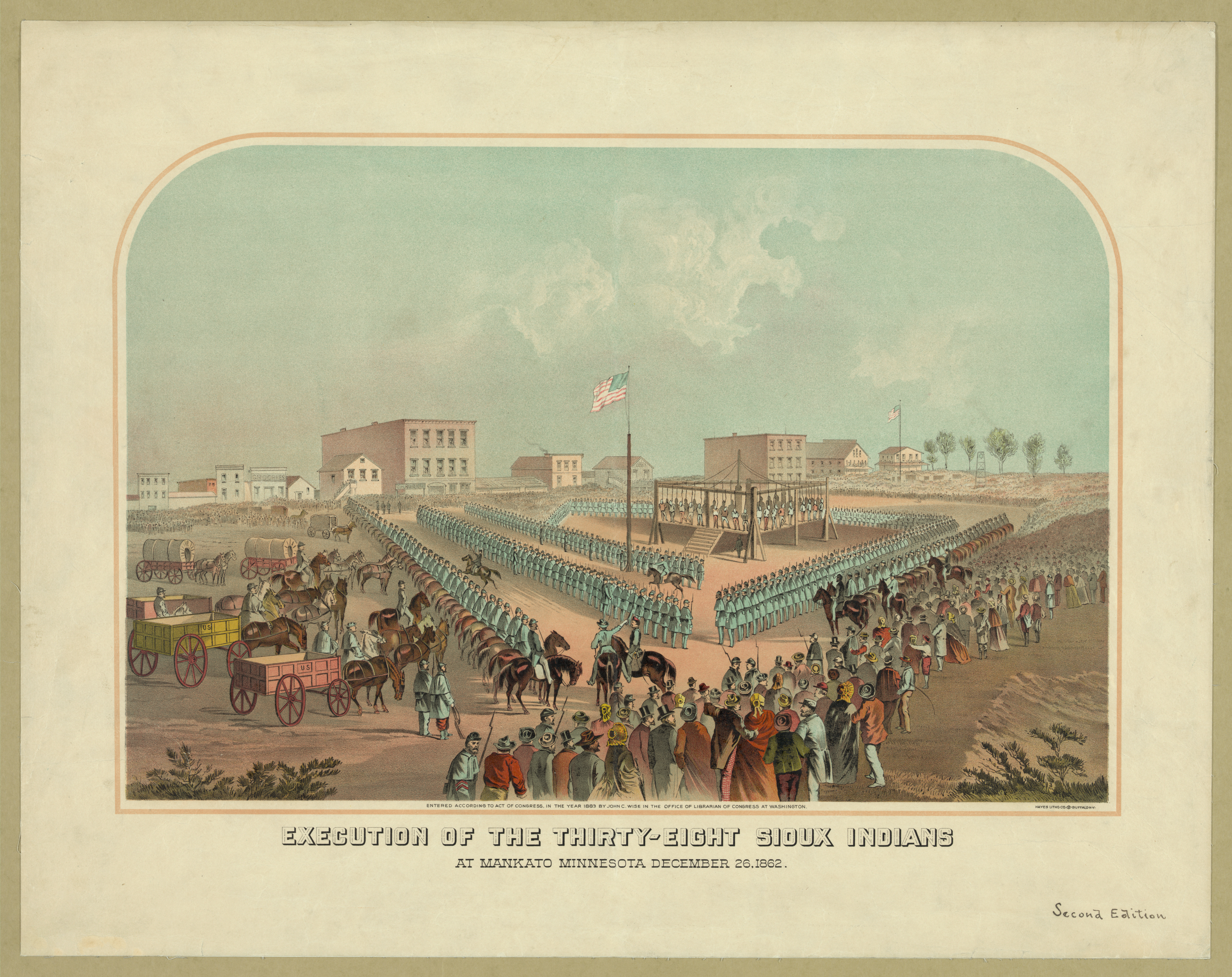
- Drawing of the 1862 mass hanging in Mankato, Minnesota
Date	December 26, 1862; 163 years ago
Location	Mankato, Minnesota, U.S. 44°10′02″N 94°00′11″W
Status	Largest single-day mass execution in American history

Belligerents
United States: Union Army; State of Minnesota	Dakota (Santee Sioux)

Commanders and leaders
Abraham Lincoln (ordered execution); Henry Hastings Sibley; Stephen Miller	None (prisoners of war)

Strength
1,500–2,000 soldiers (guarding execution)	38 prisoners

Casualties and losses
None	38 hanged (2 executed by mistake)
- An estimated 4,000 civilian spectators attended.

Following the Dakota War of 1862, the U.S. government executed 38 Dakota men in Mankato, Minnesota, on December 26, 1862, in the largest mass execution in American history. In the course of the conflict, 358 American settlers, 77 soldiers, and 36 militia had been killed. A military commission assembled in the aftermath carried out rushed trials of the Dakota men, some lasting only minutes, and ultimately sentencing 307 to death. All but four death sentences were confirmed by Colonel Henry Hastings Sibley. President Abraham Lincoln then reviewed the cases, commuting 264 sentences but approving 39 executions, one later reprieved, amid pressure from Minnesota officials for harsher punishment. The executions, conducted on a specially built gallows before 4,000 spectators, were guarded by 2,000 troops due to local hostility.

A 1912 monument to the hangings was removed in 1971 amid protests, and today, the Mankato Pow-wow and memorial rides honor the executed.

== Background ==
During the 1862 Dakota War, Dakota men attacked over 500 white settlers and took hundreds of "mixed-blood" and white hostages, almost all women and children, causing thousands more to flee southern Minnesota. By the end of the war, 358 settlers had been killed, in addition to 77 soldiers and 36 volunteer militia and armed civilians killed in battle. The total number of Dakota casualties is unknown, but 150 Dakota men died in battle. Approximately 2,000 Dakota surrendered or were taken into custody at Fort Snelling, including at least 1,658 non-combatants, as well as those who had opposed the war and helped to free the hostages.

== Trials ==
On September 27, 1862, Colonel Henry Hastings Sibley ordered the creation of a military commission to conduct trials of the Dakota after the Dakota War of 1862. One year later, the judge advocate general determined that Sibley did not have the authority to convene trials of the Dakota due to his level of prejudice and that his actions had violated Article 65 of the United States Articles of War. However, by then the executions had already occurred, and the American Civil War continued to distract the U.S. government.

The trials themselves were deficient in many ways, even by military standards, and the officers who oversaw them did not conduct them according to military law. The 400-odd trials commenced on September 28, 1862, and were completed on November 3; some lasted less than 5 minutes. No one explained the proceedings to the defendants, nor were the Dakota represented by defense attorneys.

The trials were also conducted in an atmosphere of extreme racist hostility towards the defendants expressed by the citizenry, the elected officials of the state of Minnesota, and the men conducting the trials themselves. By November 3, the military commission had held trials of 392 Dakota men, with as many as 42 tried in a single day. By November 7 the verdicts were in; the military commission announced that 307 Dakota prisoners had been convicted of the crimes of murder and rape and were sentenced to death. Sibley confirmed all but four of the death sentences.

President Lincoln was informed by Maj. Gen. John Pope of the sentences on November 10, 1862, in a telegraphic dispatch from Minnesota. His response to Pope was: "Please forward, as soon as possible, the full and complete record of these convictions. And if the record does not indicate the more guilty and influential, of the culprits, please have a careful statement made on these points and forwarded to me. Please send all by mail."

When the death sentences were made public, Henry Benjamin Whipple, the Episcopal bishop of Minnesota and a reformer of U.S. Indian policy, responded by publishing an open letter. He also went to Washington, D.C. in the fall of 1862 to urge Lincoln to proceed with leniency. On the other hand, General Pope and Minnesota Senator Morton S. Wilkinson warned Lincoln that the white population opposed leniency. Governor Alexander Ramsey warned Lincoln that, unless all 303 Dakota were executed, "[P]rivate revenge would on all this border take the place of official judgment on these Indians."

Lincoln completed his review of the transcripts of the 303 trials with the help of two White House lawyers in under a month. On December 11, 1862, he addressed the Senate regarding his final decision (as he had been requested to do by a resolution passed by that body on December 5, 1862):

Anxious to not act with so much clemency as to encourage another outbreak on the one hand, nor with so much severity as to be real cruelty on the other, I caused a careful examination of the records of trials to be made, in view of first ordering the execution of such as had been proved guilty of violating females. Contrary to my expectations, only two of this class were found. I then directed a further examination, and a classification of all who were proven to have participated in massacres, as distinguished from participation in battles. This class numbered forty, and included the two convicted of female violation. One of the number is strongly recommended by the Commission which tried them for commutation to ten years' imprisonment. I have ordered the other thirty-nine to be executed on Friday, the 19th instant."

In the end, Lincoln commuted the death sentences of 264 prisoners and allowed the execution of 39 men. On December 23, however, Lincoln suspended the execution of one of the 39 condemned men, Tatemima (Round Wind), after Sibley telegraphed him that new information led him to doubt the prisoner's guilt. Thus, the number of condemned men was reduced to the final 38.

Even partial clemency resulted in protests from Minnesota, which persisted until the Secretary of the Interior offered white Minnesotans "reasonable compensation for the depredations committed." Republicans did not fare as well in Minnesota in the 1864 election as they had before. Ramsey (by then a senator) informed Lincoln that more hangings would have resulted in a larger electoral majority. The President reportedly replied, "I could not afford to hang men for votes."

== Execution ==
Companies D, E, and H of the 9th Minnesota, Companies A, B, F, G, H, and K 10th Minnesota and the 1st Minnesota Cavalry were part of the 2,000 man military guard for the 38 prisoners hanged December 26, 1862, in Mankato, Minnesota. It remains the largest single-day mass execution in American history. The size of the guard force was dictated by the numbers of angry Minnesotans encamped at Mankato and the concern of what they wanted to do to the prisoners not being hanged.

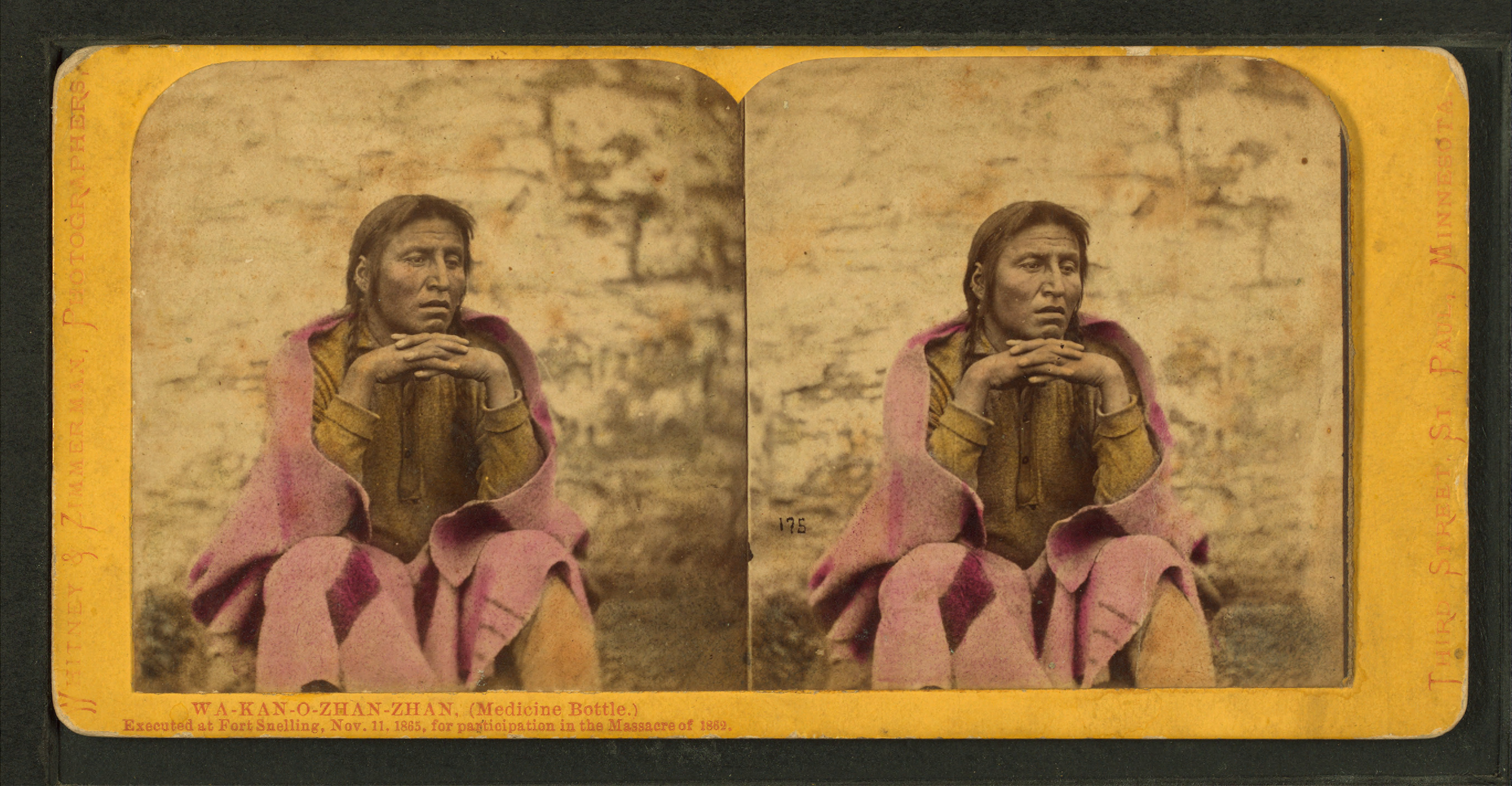
Wa-kan-o-zhan-zhan (Medicine Bottle)

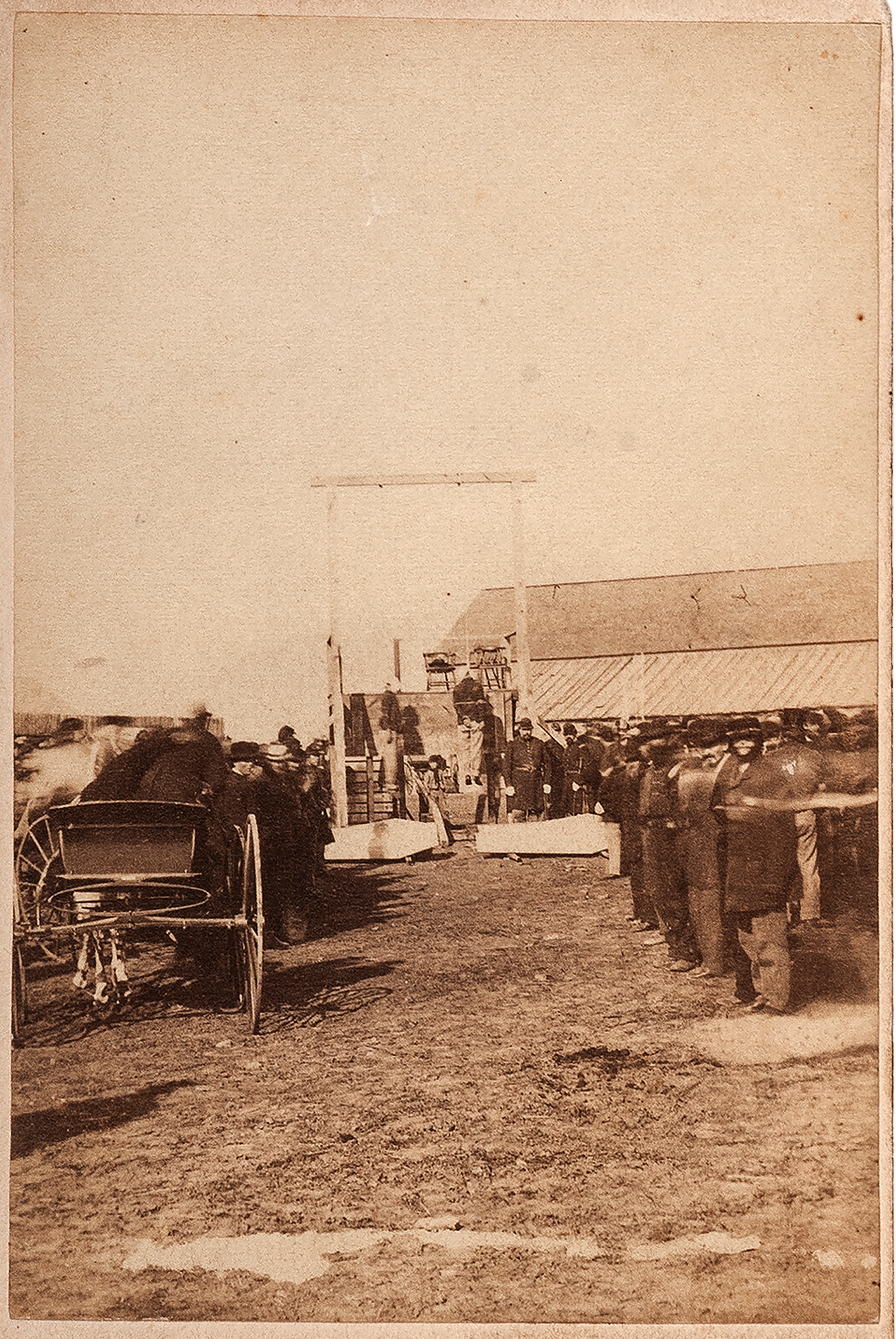
Hanging of Little Six and Medicine Bottle 1865

The execution was public, on a square platform designed to drop from under the condemned. According to a witness, "As the last moment rapidly approached, they each called out their name and shouted in their native language: 'I’m here! I’m here!'" The gallows was built around the outside of the square with ten nooses per side. After the regimental surgeons pronounced the men dead, they were buried en masse in an unfrozen sand bar of the Minnesota River. Before they were buried, an unknown person nicknamed "Dr. Sheardown" possibly removed some of the prisoners' skin. Despite having a large guard force posted at the grave-site, all of the bodies were exhumed and taken away the first night.

At least three Dakota leaders escaped north to the Red River Colony. In January 1864, Little Six and Medicine Bottle were kidnapped, drugged and taken back across the border to Fort Pembina, where they were arrested by Major Edwin A. C. Hatch. Hatch's Independent Battalion of Cavalry took the two chiefs to Fort Snelling, where they were tried and later hanged in November 1865. Little Leaf managed to evade capture.

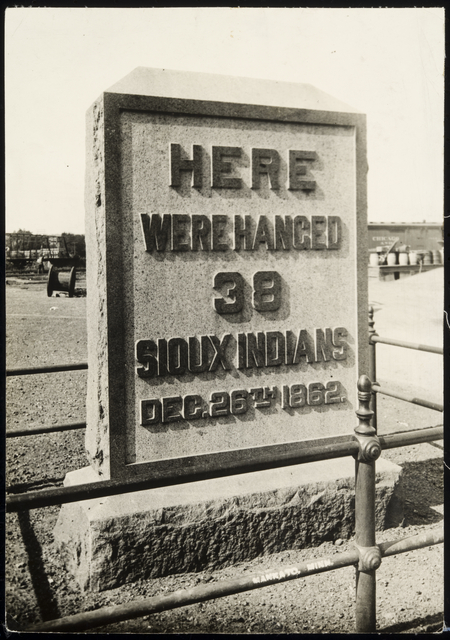
Monument indicating where the thirty-eight Dakota were hanged following the U.S.–Dakota War of 1862, Mankato, Minnesota. Placed in 1912, it was removed in 1971.

== Medical aftermath ==
Because of the high demand for cadavers for anatomical study, several doctors wanted to obtain the bodies after the execution. The grave was reopened in the night and the bodies were distributed among the doctors. William Worrall Mayo received the body of Maȟpiya Akan Nažiŋ (Stands on Clouds), also known as "Cut Nose". Mayo brought the body of Maȟpiya Akan Nažiŋ to Le Sueur, Minnesota, where he dissected it in the presence of medical colleagues. Afterward, he had the skeleton cleaned, dried and varnished. Mayo kept it in an iron kettle in his home office. His sons received their first lessons in osteology based on this skeleton.

In 1998, the identifiable remains of Maȟpiya Akan Nažiŋ and other Dakota were returned by the Mayo Clinic to a Dakota tribe for reburial per the Native American Graves Protection and Repatriation Act. The Mayo Clinic created a scholarship for a Native American student as apology for having misused the chief's body.
