= Red River Broadcasting =

American television and radio broadcast company

Red River Broadcasting was a television broadcasting company based in Fargo, North Dakota. It operated Fox affiliates in the Fargo, North Dakota and Duluth, Minnesota–Superior, Wisconsin television markets.

Curtis Squire, Inc., a holding company in Eden Prairie, Minnesota, owned 100% of Red River Broadcasting. The company, which formerly owned Regis Corporation, is owned by Anita, Bill, David, Drew, and James Kunin. Kathy Lau is the COO.

In addition to television stations, Red River Broadcasting once operated radio stations through a sister company named Red Rock Radio. At its height, Red Rock Radio owned a total of 25 stations in Minnesota and Wisconsin. However, following the death of Myron Kunin in 2013, his surviving family members decided to liquidate his broadcasting assets and sold the stations to various buyers.

== Final properties ==
City of license/Market	Station	Channel TV (RF)	Years Owned	Network affiliation
Duluth, Minnesota - Superior, Wisconsin	KQDS-TV	21 (17)	1998-2024	Fox
Fargo, North Dakota	KVRR	15 (19)	1983-2024	Fox
Jamestown, North Dakota	KJRR (Satellite of KVRR)	7 (7)	1988-2024	Fox
Pembina, North Dakota	KNRR (Satellite of KVRR)	12 (12)	1986-2024	Fox
Thief River Falls, Minnesota - Grand Forks, North Dakota	KBRR (Satellite of KVRR)	10 (10)	1985-2024	Fox

== Former properties ==
=== Television ===
City of license/Market	Station	Channel TV (RF)	Years owned	Current status
Sioux Falls, South Dakota	KDLT-TV	46 (21)	1994–2019	NBC affiliate owned by Gray Television
Mitchell, South Dakota	KDLV-TV (Satellite of KDLT-TV)	5 (26)	1997–2019	NBC affiliate owned by Gray Television

=== Radio ===
==== Minnesota ====
- KQDS, Duluth (now KJOQ)
- KQDS-FM, Duluth
  - KAOD, Babbitt (simulcast KQDS-FM, now KZJZ)
  - KBAJ, Deer River (simulcast KQDS-FM)
  - WXXZ, Grand Marais (simulcast KQDS-FM, later WFNX)
- WWAX, Hermantown (now WWPE-FM)
- KZIO, Two Harbors
- KGHS, International Falls
- KSDM, International Falls
- KGPZ, Coleraine (now WDKE)
- KRBT, Eveleth
- WEVE-FM, Eveleth
- KFGI, Crosby
- KLKS, Breezy Point
- WWWI, Baxter
- WWWI-FM, Pillager
- KKIN, Aitkin
- KKIN-FM, Aitkin
- WCMP, Pine City
- WCMP-FM, Pine City

==== Wisconsin ====
- WLMX-FM, Balsam Lake (now WZEZ)
- WXCX, Siren
- WHSM, Hayward (now WBZH)
- WHSM-FM, Hayward
- WXCE, Amery
