= KFNK =

Franklin, Minnesota; United States
- Frequency: 89.5 MHz

Programming
- Format: Defunct (formerly Southern Gospel)

Ownership
- Owner: Minnesota Christian Broadcasting, Inc.
- Sister stations: KCFB, KTIG, WZFJ

Technical information
- Licensing authority: FCC
- Facility ID: 177030
- Class: A
- ERP: 100 watts
- HAAT: 16 meters (52 ft)
- Transmitter coordinates: 44°31′38″N 94°52′35″W

Links
- Public license information: Public file; LMS
- Webcast: Listen Live
- Website: thegospelstation.com

KFNK (89.5 FM) was a radio station licensed to Franklin, Minnesota, US. The station was owned by Minnesota Christian Broadcasting, Inc.

KFNK broadcast a traditional Christian teaching and preaching format to the Franklin, Minnesota area.

Minnesota Christian Broadcasting, Inc. acquired KFNK/89.5 from South Central Oklahoma Christian Broadcasting for $21,000, effective June 3, 2020.

KFNK and other stations owned by South Central Oklahoma Christian Broadcasting went silent earlier in 2020, saying they could not receive enough donations to stay on the air. The station was licensed for 100 watts, the minimum for a full-power station, serving a small area east of Redwood Falls, Minnesota.

MCBI owns KCFB/91.5 (St. Cloud, Minnesota), KTIG/102.7 (Pequot Lakes-Brainerd, Minnesota), WZFJ/104.3 (Breezy Point-Brainerd, Minnesota) and K240BI/95.9 (Park Rapids, Minnesota). KCFB, KTIG, and K240BI simulcast a traditional Christian teaching and preaching format as “The Word” while WZFJ carries Contemporary Christian as “The Pulse.”

== History ==
This station was assigned call sign KFNK on November 19, 2012.

KFNK's owners surrendered the station's license to the Federal Communications Commission for cancellation on December 15, 2020.
