= KKIN =

KKIN may refer to:

- KKIN (AM), a radio station (930 AM) licensed to Aitkin, Minnesota, United States
- KKIN-FM, a radio station (94.3 FM) licensed to Aitkin, Minnesota, United States
