= WWWI-FM =

- Pillager, Minnesota; United States
- Broadcast area: Brainerd, Minnesota
- Frequency: 95.9 MHz
- Branding: Cash 95.9

Programming
- Format: Country; adult standards

Ownership
- Owner: Jimmy D. Birkemeyer; (R & J Broadcasting, Inc.)
- Sister stations: KFGI; KKIN; KKIN-FM; KLKS; WWWI

History
- First air date: November 1999 (as KBKK)
- Former call signs: KBKK (1998–2004)

Technical information
- Licensing authority: FCC
- Facility ID: 17029
- Class: A
- ERP: 6,000 watts
- HAAT: 73 meters (240 ft)
- Transmitter coordinates: 46°15′3″N 94°19′30″W

Links
- Public license information: Public file; LMS
- Webcast: Listen live
- Website: rjbroadcasting.com/kkin-kfgi-wwwi-klks/

WWWI-FM (95.9 FM, "Cash 95") is a radio station licensed to Pillager, Minnesota, and serving the Brainerd Lakes Area. The station is owned by Jimmy D. Birkemeyer's R & J Broadcasting. Its sister station is WWWI (1270 AM), which airs a news/talk format. WWWI-FM airs a hybrid country music and adult standards format.

== History ==
The station began as KBKK, licensed to Pillager, Minnesota, and serving the Brainerd Lakes Area. In October 1999, NorthPine reported that KBKK was testing its facilities, and by November 1999 the station was on the air with Jones Radio Networks' nostalgia format. The station was owned by DJ Broadcasting, which was held equally by Edward De La Hunt of Park Rapids and his son, David De La Hunt of Menahga.

On August 5, 2002, KBKK changed from Jones Radio Networks' Music of Your Life format to country. The move shifted the station from direct competition with KLKS (104.3 FM) in Breezy Point to competition with Brainerd-area country stations B93.3 and Froggy 103.5. KBKK also carried Bill O'Reilly's syndicated program in middays.

In 2004, Tower Broadcasting, owned by James and Mary Pryor, purchased KBKK from DJ Broadcasting for $360,000. Tower already owned WWWI (1270 AM) in Baxter. The station's call sign was changed to WWWI-FM effective July 1, 2004.

Following the Tower purchase, 95.9 dropped country and became part of a news/talk operation with WWWI AM. Programming on the FM included Bill O'Reilly, Joe Soucheray's Garage Logic, and Coast to Coast AM, while the AM station added hosts including Ed Schultz and Neal Boortz. The stations shared the "3WI" identity, simulcast a morning show, and carried CBS News.

In 2012, Red Rock Radio agreed to purchase WWWI and WWWI-FM from Tower Broadcasting for $700,000. Red Rock began operating the stations under a time brokerage agreement on July 1, 2012, while both stations were airing news/talk programming.

During Red Rock's ownership, WWWI-FM moved to classic rock. In 2014, NorthPine reported that WWWI-FM would become part of the KQDS-FM classic rock simulcast, effective October 6, 2014.

In 2016, Red Rock Radio agreed to sell eight stations, including WWWI-FM, to R&J Broadcasting. The filed purchase price was $1.185 million, and NorthPine identified R&J Broadcasting as owned by Jimmy Birkemeyer of Ada, Minnesota. The Federal Communications Commission granted the assignment of WWWI-FM from Red Rock Radio Corp. to R&J Broadcasting in December 2016.

After R&J began operating the former Red Rock stations, WWWI-FM dropped its KQDS-FM simulcast and changed to classic country as "Cash 95".

== Honors and awards ==
In February 2006, station co-owner Mary Pryor was awarded the Marine Corps League Distinguished Citizen Award for her support of the annual Toys for Kids program. The award by the Heartland Detachment of the Marine Corps League and the Heartland Auxiliary Unit, which sponsor Toys for Kids. (The "Toys for Kids" program is independent of the national Toys for Tots program.) This was the first time the award had been presented to a civilian in the Brainerd area.
