= WWWI =

WWWI may refer to:

- WWWI (AM), a radio station (1270 AM) licensed to Baxter, Minnesota, United States
- WWWI-FM, a radio station (95.9 FM) licensed to Pillager, Minnesota
- WWWI-Directory, a UK business directory
- WPTI, a radio station (94.5 FM) licensed to serve Eden, North Carolina, United States, which held the call sign WWWI from 1984 to 1986
