= KLKS (FM) =

Coordinates: 46.60194°N 94.31417°W

- Pequot Lakes, Minnesota; United States
- Broadcast area: Brainerd Lakes Area
- Frequency: 100.1 MHz
- Branding: Talk 100

Programming
- Format: Talk radio
- Affiliations: CBS News Radio; Premiere Networks; Westwood One

Ownership
- Owner: Jimmy D. Birkemeyer; (R & J Broadcasting, Inc.)

History
- First air date: 2002 (as WZFJ)
- Former call signs: WZFJ (2002–2012)
- Call sign meaning: "K-Lakes" (previous branding)

Technical information
- Licensing authority: FCC
- Facility ID: 76432
- Class: C2
- ERP: 5,200 watts
- HAAT: 107 meters (351 ft)

Links
- Public license information: Public file; LMS
- Website: rjbroadcasting.com/kkin-kfgi-wwwi-klks/

KLKS (100.1 FM; "Talk 100") is an American radio station owned by Jimmy D. Birkemeyer's R & J Broadcasting and located in Pequot Lakes, Minnesota. It serves the Brainerd Lakes Area of central Minnesota.

It is owned by R & J Broadcasting, Inc. Its sister stations are KKIN, KKIN-FM, KFGI, WWWI-FM, and WWWI.

== Ownership ==
KLKS was built in 1983 by Allen Gray, who has a broadcasting career of 60 years. He was inducted into the Museum of Broadcasting Hall of Fame in 2001. The station, at the time operating on 104.3 FM in Breezy Point, had a full service programming format.

In June 2012, it was announced that KLKS was being sold by Lakes Broadcasting Group, Inc. to Minnesota Christian Broadcasters. That transaction was consummated on September 11, 2012, at a purchase price of $350,000. According to FCC filings, however, the station continued to operate commercially.

On September 12, 2012, KLKS swapped frequencies with WZFJ (100.1 FM). 104.3 adopted the contemporary Christian format that had been aired on 100.1, branded as The Pulse, while 100.1 KLKS went silent.

On March 21, 2013, KLKS was purchased by Red Rock Radio Corp.; the transaction, at a purchase price of $250,000, was consummated on August 1, 2013. This made KLKS the sixth station in the area for Red Rock Radio.

On August 9, 2013, KLKS returned to the air with a classic hits format, branded as The Wave. This format and branding was later dropped in the fall of 2014 when the station adopted a talk radio format under the branding Talk 100.

On September 16, 2016, Red Rock Radio announced that it would sell KLKS to R & J Broadcasting as part of an eight station deal; the sale was completed on December 21, 2016.
