= MCBI =

MCBI can refer to:

- Minnesota Christian Broadcasters
- MetroCorp Bancshares (Nasdaq: MCBI)
