= Wilford Fawcett =

American sports shooter and publisher

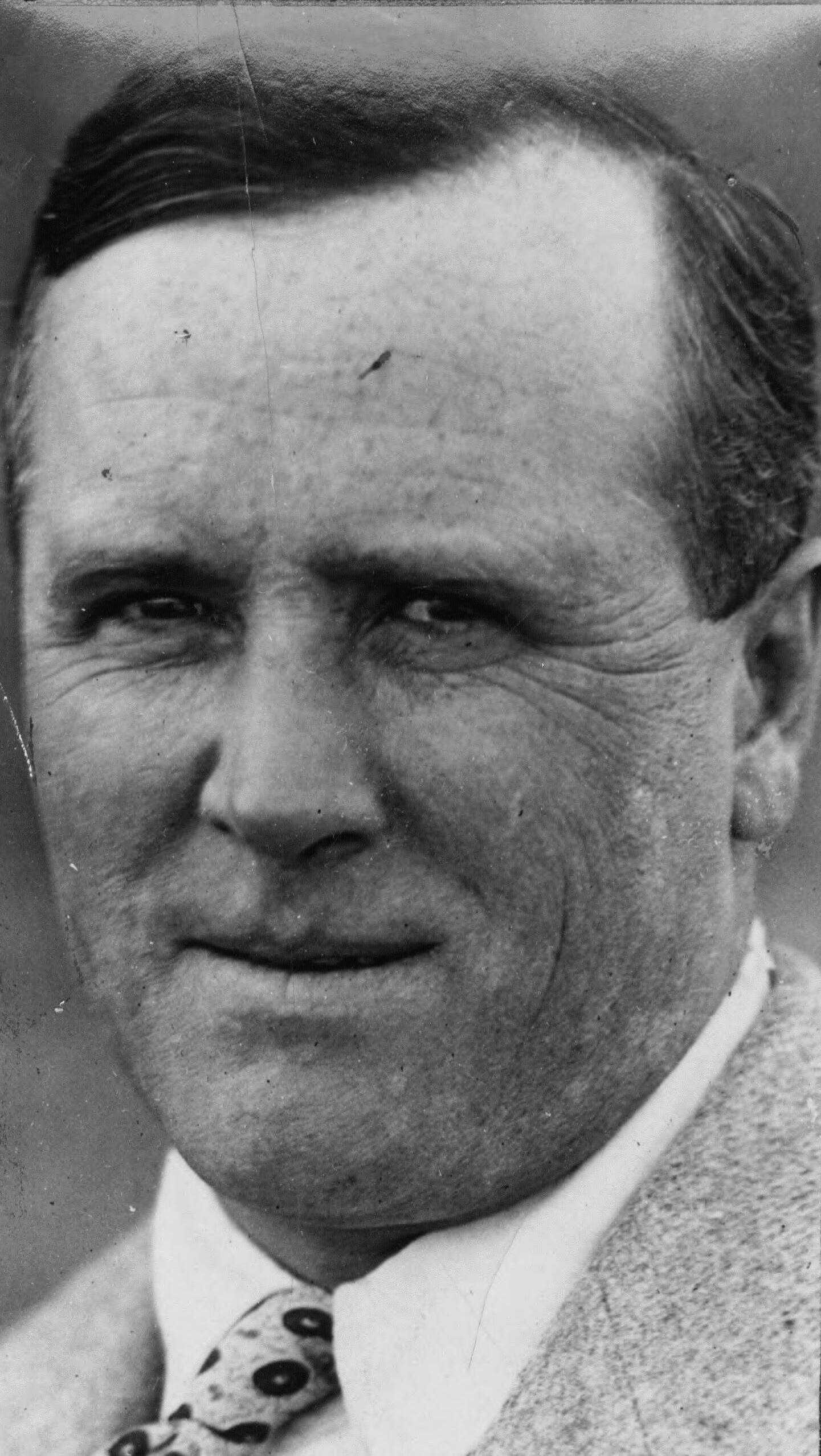

Personal information
- Born: Wilford Hamilton Fawcett; April 29, 1885 Woodstock, Ontario, Canada
- Died: February 7, 1940 (aged 54) Hollywood, California, United States
- Occupation(s): Publisher, sports shooter

Sport
- Sport: Sports shooting

Wilford Hamilton Fawcett (/ˈfɔːsɪt/; April 29, 1885 – February 7, 1940), also known as Captain Billy, was an American magazine publisher and sports shooter. He competed in the trap event at the 1924 Summer Olympics.

== Biography ==
At the age of 16, Fawcett ran away from home to join the U.S. Army, and the Spanish–American War took him to the Philippines. Back in Minnesota, he became a police reporter for the Minneapolis Journal. While a World War I Army captain, Fawcett's experience with the Army publication Stars and Stripes gave him the notion to get into publishing, and his bawdy cartoon and joke magazine, Captain Billy's Whiz Bang, became the launch pad for the vast Fawcett Publications publishing empire embracing magazines, comic books and paperback books.

The title Captain Billy's Whiz Bang combined Fawcett's military moniker with the nickname of a destructive World War I artillery shell. According to one account, the earliest issues were mimeographed pamphlets, typed on a borrowed typewriter and peddled around Minneapolis by Captain Billy and his four sons. However, in Captain Billy's version, he stated that when he began publishing in October 1919, he ordered a print run of 5,000 copies because of the discount on a large order compared with rates for only several hundred copies. Distributing free copies of Captain Billy's Whiz Bang to wounded veterans and his Minnesota friends, he then circulated the remaining copies to newsstands in hotels. With gags like, "AWOL means After Women Or Liquor", the joke book caught on, and in 1921, Captain Billy made the highly inflated claim that his sales were "soaring to the million mark."

The book Humor Magazines and Comic Periodicals notes:

Few periodicals reflect the post-WW I cultural change in American life as well as Captain Billy’s Whiz Bang. To some people [it] represented the decline of morality and the flaunting of sexual immodesty; to others it signified an increase in openness. For much of the 1920s, Captain Billy’s was the most prominent comic magazine in America with its mix of racy poetry and naughty jokes and puns, aimed at a small-town audience with pretensions of "sophistication".

Captain Billy's Whiz Bang is referenced in the lyrics to the song "Trouble" from Meredith Willson's The Music Man (1957): "Is there a nicotine stain on his index finger? A dime novel hidden in the corncrib? Is he starting to memorize jokes from Captain Billy's Whiz Bang?" (Note: An anachronism, since The Music Man takes place in River City, Iowa, during 1912, seven years before the magazine's premiere issue.)

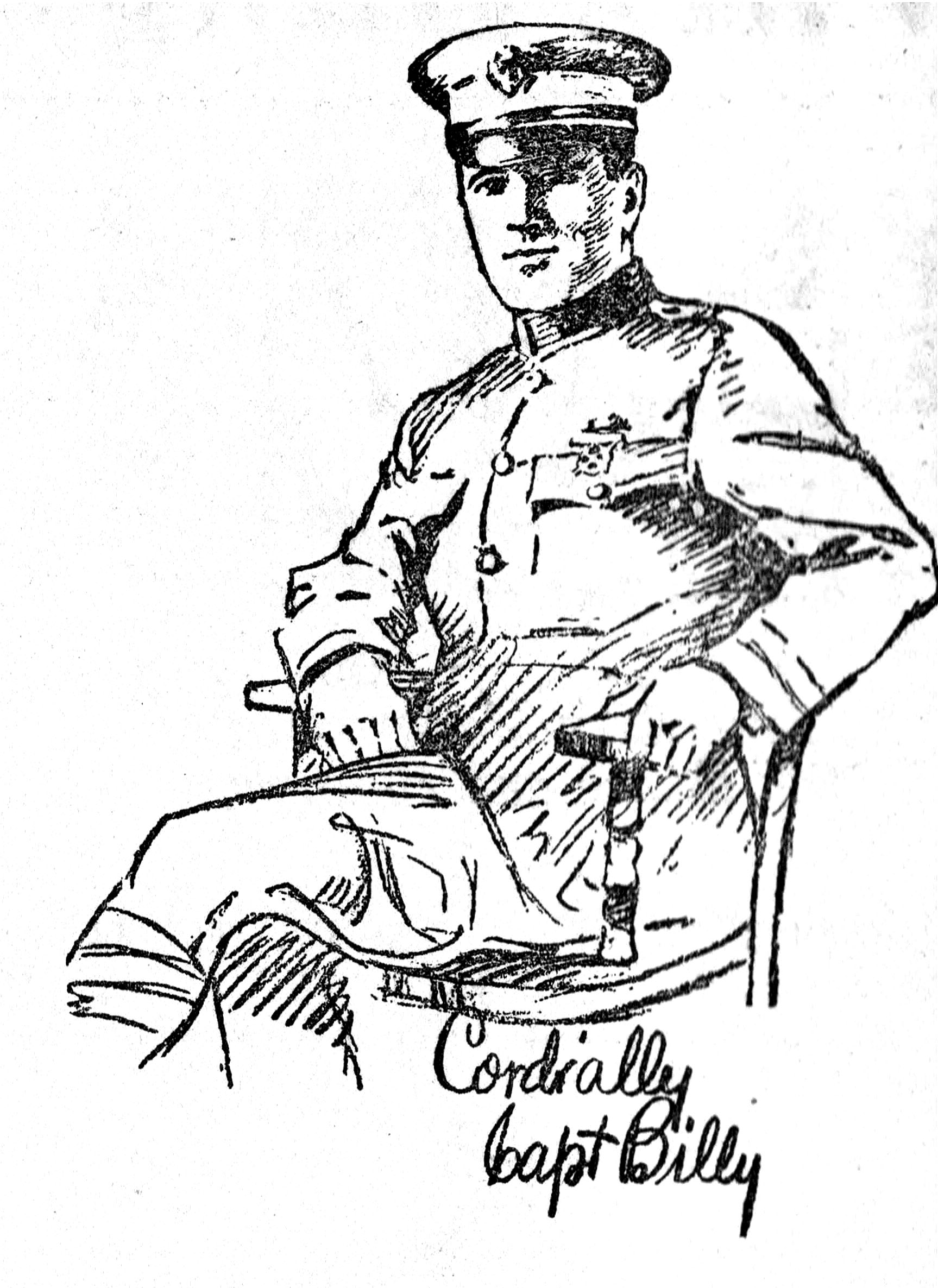
A drawing of Capt. Billy Fawcett, from the April 1923 Capt. Billy's Whiz Bang

The publication, delivered in a 64-page, saddle-stitched, digest-sized format, soon saw a dramatic increase in sales. By 1923, the magazine had a circulation of 425,000 with $500,000 annual profits. With the rising readership of Captain Billy's Whiz Bang, Fawcett racked up more sales with Whiz Bang annuals, and in 1926, he launched a similar publication, Smokehouse Monthly. The popularity of Whiz Bang peaked during the 1920s. It continued into the 1930s, but circulation slowed as readers graduated to the more sophisticated humor of Esquire, founded in 1933. Whiz Bang had an influence on many other digest-sized cartoon humor publications, including Charley Jones Laugh Book, which was still being published during the 1950s.

During the 1930s, Fawcett and his sons established a line of magazines which eventually reached a combined circulation of ten million a month in newsstand sales. True Confessions alone had a circulation of two million a month.

Captain Billy's success as a publisher prompted him to create the Breezy Point Resort on Pelican Lake in Breezy Point, Minnesota. Since celebrity visitors came to the resort, Captain Billy had the road from Breezy Point into Pequot Lakes blacktopped at his own expense. His building program at the Resort included the construction of a massive lodge, planned to accommodate 700 people, using native Norway pines, some 70 feet (21 m) in length. Celebrities who stayed at Breezy Point included Carole Lombard, Tom Mix and Clark Gable. The Fawcett House, Captain Billy's personal log mansion, is made available for public rental today. Decorated with elk and deer skins, Fawcett House has ten bedrooms and eight baths. The living room has a cathedral ceiling, a loft, a bar and a large field rock fireplace.

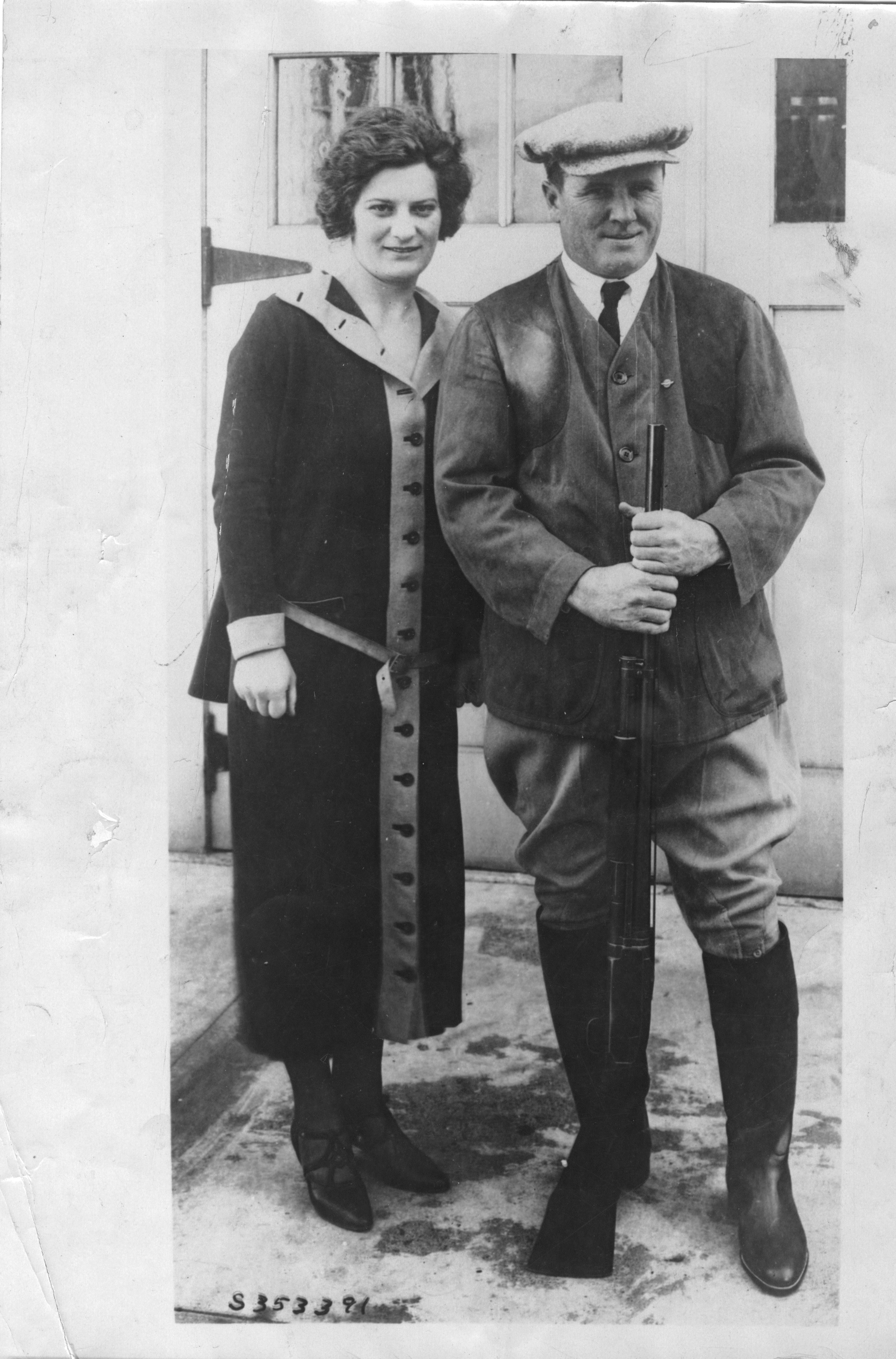
Mr. & Mrs. Fawcett, two of the best trap shooters in the United States. "Captain Billy" was manager of the 1924 American Olympic trapshooting team competing in Paris, France.

Harry Truman was another Breezy Point guest. Edward McKim, a friend of Truman's since World War I, told of visits to the Resort in 1932 and Truman's success at the Breezy Point slot machine:

Captain Billy was quite a shot with a shotgun. He was on the American Olympic team at one time. He had some traps out there, so we did a little shooting with him. He had a couple of guests, one of whom was Dr. Joe Mayo, the son of Dr. Charlie Mayo. Dr. Joe was killed a few years later in an automobile accident. He was the brother of Dr. Chuck Mayo who just retired from the Mayo Foundation. We did a little trap shooting at that time, but we went up there almost every night for dinner. It was a 35 or 40-mile (64 km) drive. We stopped at a barber shop at Brainerd going up, and he hit the jackpot in a machine in the lower lobby of the hotel. Then he hit the jackpot up at Breezy Point the same night.

In some issues of Whiz Bang, Captain Billy wrote about his vacations in Los Angeles, Miami, New York and Paris, along with items about his celebrity friends, including Jack Dempsey, Sinclair Lewis, and Ring Lardner.

Captain Billy and his wife Claire had four sons and one daughter: Roger, Wilford, Marion Claire, Gordon Wesley and the youngest, Roscoe. Wilford Fawcett died in 1940 in Hollywood, California.

== See also ==
- Wilford H. Fawcett House
