= KLKS =

KLKS may refer to:

- KLKS (FM), a radio station (100.1 FM) licensed to serve Pequot Lakes, Minnesota, United States
- KLKS-LP, a defunct low-power television station (channel 14) formerly licensed to serve Breezy Point, Minnesota, translating KARE
