= WWWI (AM) =

Coordinates: 46°21′26.5″N 94°12′56″W

Simulcasts KLKS, Pequot Lakes
- Baxter, Minnesota; United States
- Broadcast area: Brainerd, Minnesota
- Frequency: 1270 kHz
- Branding: Talk 100

Programming
- Format: Talk

Ownership
- Owner: Jimmy D. Birkemeyer; (R & J Broadcasting, Inc.)
- Sister stations: KFGI; KKIN; KKIN-FM; KLKS; WWWI-FM

History
- First air date: August 29, 1987
- Former call signs: WJJY (1986–1994)

Technical information
- Licensing authority: FCC
- Facility ID: 67359
- Class: D
- Power: 5,000 watts day; 45 watts night
- Translator: 96.3 W242DB (Baxter)

Links
- Public license information: Public file; LMS
- Website: rjbroadcasting.com/kkin-kfgi-wwwi-klks/

WWWI (1270 kHz) is an AM radio station in Baxter/Brainerd, Minnesota airing a talk format and simulcasting KLKS (100.1 FM). Established in 1987 as WJJY, the station is owned by Jimmy D. Birkemeyer's R & J Broadcasting.

On September 16, 2016, Red Rock Radio announced that it would sell WWWI to R & J Broadcasting as part of an eight station deal; the sale was completed on December 21, 2016.
