= Northern Pacific Railroad Shops Historic District =

Historic district in Minnesota, United States

- U.S. National Register of Historic Places
- U.S. Historic district
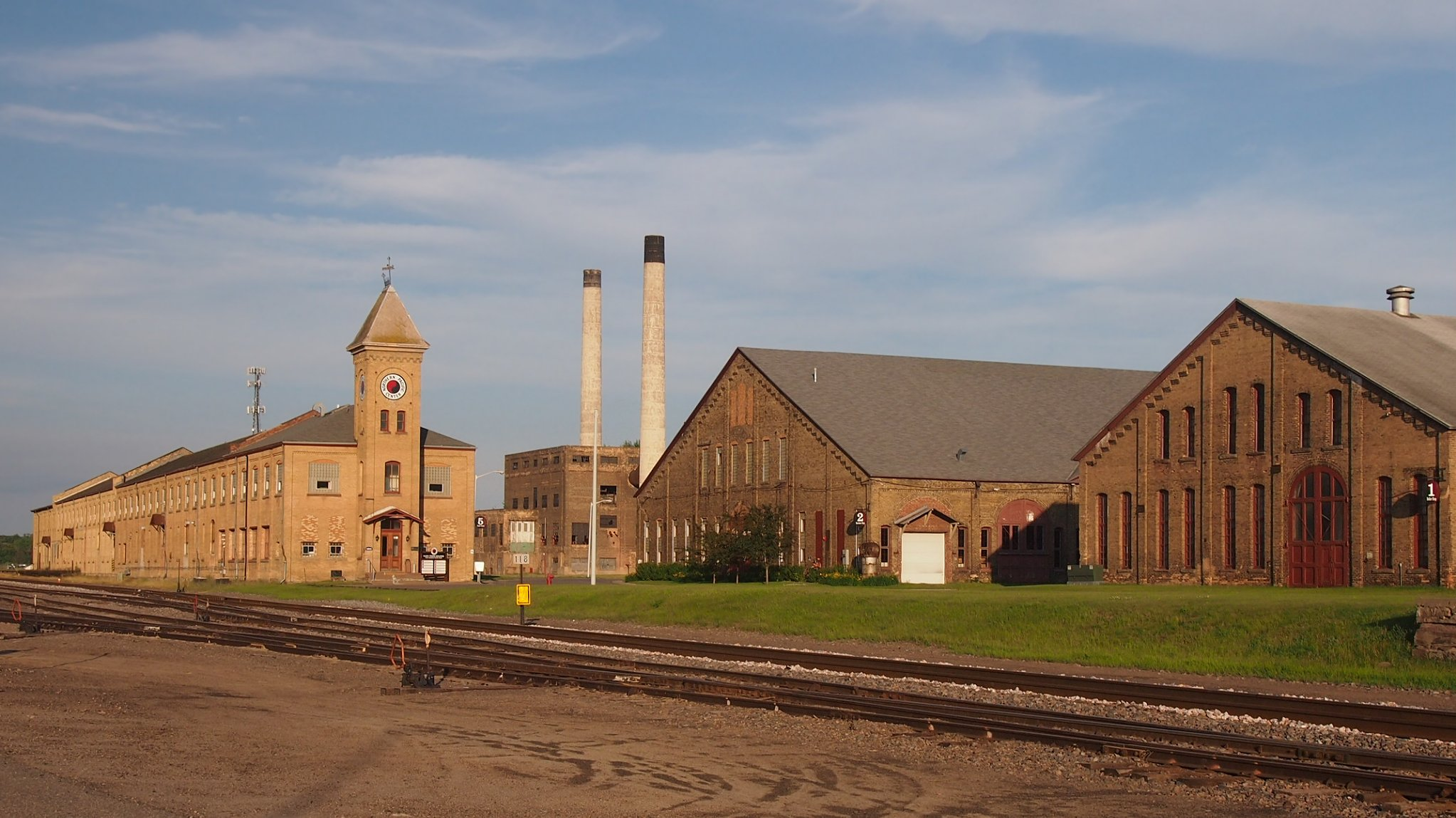
- Northern Pacific Railroad Shops Historic District from the northwest

- Location within Minnesota Location within the United States
- Location: Roughly bounded by the Burlington Northern Railroad tracks, Laurel and 13th Sts. Brainerd, Minnesota
- Coordinates: 46°21′23″N 94°11′8″W
- Area: 25 acres (10 ha)
- Built: 1882
- Architect: Northern Pacific Engineering Department
- NRHP reference No.: 88003024
- Added to NRHP: January 3, 1989

The Northern Pacific Railroad Shops Historic District, located in Brainerd, in the U.S. state of Minnesota is a set of buildings built by the Northern Pacific Railroad and later listed on the National Register of Historic Places.

The site was originally built in 1882. A passenger station at the site was destroyed by fire and rebuilt around 1919, using concrete and brick for walls and green Ludowici tile for the building's roof. The ground floor of the building had a waiting room, women's room, smoking room, and baggage room, while the second-floor hosted offices of the Minnesota and International Railway and Northern Pacific officers.

The buildings were listed on the National Register of Historic Places in 1989.
