= KCFB =

Christian radio station in St. Cloud, Minnesota

Coordinates: 45°30′02″N 94°14′31″W

- Saint Cloud, Minnesota; United States
- Frequency: 91.5 MHz
- Branding: The Word

Programming
- Format: Christian radio

Ownership
- Owner: Minnesota Christian Broadcasters, Inc.
- Sister stations: KTIG, WZFJ, KFNK

History
- First air date: 1987

Technical information
- Licensing authority: FCC
- Facility ID: 21379
- Class: C3
- ERP: 15,000 watts
- HAAT: 106 meters (348 ft)

Links
- Public license information: Public file; LMS
- Webcast: Listen live
- Website: theword.mn

KCFB is a Christian radio station licensed to Saint Cloud, Minnesota, broadcasting on 91.5 FM. The station is owned by Minnesota Christian Broadcasters, Inc.

== Programming ==
KCFB's programming includes Christian talk and teaching shows such as Truth for Life with Alistair Begg, Turning Point with David Jeremiah, Insight For Living with Chuck Swindoll, Revive Our Hearts with Nancy DeMoss Wolgemuth, In Touch with Dr. Charles Stanley, Focus on the Family, and In the Market with Janet Parshall. KTIG also airs a variety of Christian music.

== History ==
KCFB-FM officially signed on the air in 1987. The station was established as a non-commercial, listener-supported outlet dedicated to Christian programming. In its earliest years, the station operated as a relatively low-power facility, broadcasting with only 800 watts of power.

The station was acquired in November 1997, by Minnesota Christian Broadcasters, Inc. (MCBI), a regional broadcasting group based in Pequot Lakes. While the station initially maintained local studios in St. Cloud, MCBI eventually consolidated most operations to its Pequot Lakes facility to streamline regional broadcasting.

Under MCBI’s ownership, the station underwent a significant technical overhaul to expand its reach across Central Minnesota. In November 1999, KCFB increased its effective radiated power from 800 watts to 15,000 watts. This upgrade, paired with a transmitter height of 106 meters (348 feet), allowed the station to cover the entire St. Cloud metropolitan area and much of Stearns and Benton counties.

The station’s signal is transmitted from a tower on the southwest side of St. Cloud, just off Interstate 94, a facility it shares with KLZZ.
