= KFGI =

Coordinates: 46.564°N 93.951°W

- Crosby, Minnesota; United States
- Broadcast area: Brainerd–Baxter
- Frequency: 101.5 MHz
- RDS: PI: 1DD8; PS: Skeeter; RT: KFGI FM Crosby
- Branding: Skeeter 101.5

Programming
- Format: Variety hits

Ownership
- Owner: Jimmy D. Birkemeyer; (R & J Broadcasting, Inc.)
- Sister stations: KKIN, KKIN-FM, KLKS, WWWI, WWWI-FM

History
- First air date: October 10, 1990 (as KTCF-FM)
- Former call signs: KTCF-FM (1989–2002); KUAL-FM (2002–2004)
- Call sign meaning: Froggy (former branding)

Technical information
- Licensing authority: FCC
- Facility ID: 21622
- Class: C3
- ERP: 25,000 watts
- HAAT: 100 meters (330 ft)

Links
- Public license information: Public file; LMS
- Webcast: Listen live
- Website: rjbroadcasting.com/kkin-kfgi-wwwi-klks/

KFGI (101.5 FM; "Skeeter 101.5") is a radio station broadcasting a variety hits format. Established in 1990 as KTCF-FM, the station is licensed to Crosby, Minnesota, United States, and serves the Brainerd and Baxter region of central Minnesota. Its studios are at 212 N 5th Street, in Brainerd. The transmitter site is on County Road 6, between Crosby and Emily.

== History ==
The station's early call sign was KTCF-FM. A 1990 FCC application notice in Broadcasting listed KTCF(FM) as a Crosby construction permit on 101.7 MHz, seeking a transmitter-site modification near Cuyuna. By 1992, the station was listed at 101.5 MHz, when First Radio Station of Crosby, Inc. applied to change the facility to 25,000 watts ERP.

By 1995, KTCF-FM was operating as a country station. In July 1995, Broadcasting & Cable reported that First Radio Station of Crosby, Inc. was selling KTCF-FM to BL Broadcasting, Inc. for $380,000. The buyer was headed by Louis H. Buron Jr., who also owned WJJY-FM in Brainerd and other Minnesota stations. The transaction listing described KTCF-FM's facilities as 101.5 MHz, 25,000 watts, with an antenna height of 328 feet, and listed the format as country.

The station changed call signs from KTCF-FM to KUAL-FM in January 2002. FCC call-sign records list the KUAL-FM call sign as assigned to BL Broadcasting, Inc. in Crosby, effective January 23, 2002, replacing KTCF-FM. NorthPine later summarized the station's format history by noting that 101.5 changed from country to oldies in 2002.

A market reshuffling followed in 2003 and 2004. NorthPine reported in 2003 that Quarnstrom Media was purchasing the 101.5 Crosby license for $400,000, including the license and transmitter site but excluding the studio equipment and KUAL-FM call letters. The same report said Quarnstrom would be prohibited from using an oldies format for one year.

On April 1, 2004, the FCC listed a call-sign swap in which Quarnstrom Media Group's 101.5 Crosby facility changed from KUAL-FM to KFGI, while BL Broadcasting's 103.5 Brainerd facility changed from KFGI to KUAL-FM. NorthPine reported that the formats moved with the call signs: the "Kool" oldies format moved from 101.5 to 103.5, while the "Froggy" country format moved from 103.5 to 101.5.

In 2006, Alan and Linda Quarnstrom sold most of their radio holdings to Red Rock Radio Corp. NorthPine reported that the $7.5 million transaction included KFGI/101.5 in Crosby, along with stations in Aitkin, International Falls, Hayward and Siren. FCC Broadcast Actions listed the assignment of KFGI, facility ID 21622, from Quarnstrom Media Group, LLC to Red Rock Radio Corp. as granted on July 18, 2006.

During Red Rock's ownership, KFGI changed formats several times. NorthPine reported that the station returned to country in 2004, changed to classic rock in 2007 as "KQ101.5", and then switched from classic rock to variety hits as "Sam FM" at 6 p.m. on September 1, 2011. NorthPine noted that the classic rock format had originated at then-sister station KQDS-FM in Duluth, though KFGI was not a full simulcast of KQDS-FM.

In September 2015, after Westwood One discontinued its syndicated "Sam FM" format, KFGI switched to Westwood One's similar "Jack FM" variety-hits format.

In 2016, R & J Broadcasting agreed to buy KFGI and seven other Red Rock Radio stations. NorthPine reported the deal as part of Red Rock's sell-off and identified the station at the time as "101.5 Jack FM" KFGI Crosby–Aitkin–Brainerd. FCC application records listed the voluntary assignment of KFGI from Red Rock Radio Corp. to R & J Broadcasting, Inc., and FCC Broadcast Actions later listed the assignment as granted.

Under R & J Broadcasting, KFGI later became known as "Skeeter 101.5". R & J describes the station as carrying a broad pop/rock variety format with local news, weather and sports.
