= KRBT =

- Eveleth, Minnesota; United States
- Broadcast area: Iron Range
- Frequency: 1340 kHz
- Branding: The Fan 1340

Programming
- Format: Sports
- Affiliations: KFAN Sports Radio, Fox Sports Radio

Ownership
- Owner: Range Broadcasting, Inc.

History
- First air date: 1948
- Former call signs: WEVE (1948–1998)
- Call sign meaning: "Range's Best Talk" (former branding)

Technical information
- Licensing authority: FCC
- Facility ID: 29196
- Class: C
- Power: 1,000 watts unlimited
- Transmitter coordinates: 47°28′55″N 92°31′54″W
- Translator: 104.9 W285FP (Eveleth)

Links
- Public license information: Public file; LMS

KRBT (1340 AM) is a radio station broadcasting a sports format. Licensed to Eveleth, Minnesota, United States, the station serves the Iron Range area. The station is owned by Range Broadcasting, Inc., and features programming from the KFAN Radio Network, based at KFXN-FM in Minneapolis–St. Paul.

== History ==
The station went on the air in 1948 as WEVE. Originally a stand-alone music station, then a simulcast music station with WEVE-FM, the station changed its call letters to KRBT for "Range's Best Talk" in June 1998 and became a talk station. The format change to sports-talk was made following the death of the previous owner, Lew Latto, Iron Range Broadcasting, Inc. president, on August 24, 2011, and the subsequent sale to Red Rock Radio in March 2012, and has been retained by the new owner as of July 2017, Range Broadcasting, Inc.

While including local sports programming, local church programming and a Sunday morning Finnish language music show, KRBT also carries the Minnesota Twins, Minnesota Vikings, and Minnesota Wild and have introduced local live remote broadcasts from various charitable and community interest events as part of a "Local Broadcasting" initiative to return the station back to its former, locally owned, locally operated status and distinguish it from the large, multi-station ownership groups that dominate much of the country's radio landscape.
