= Wilford H. Fawcett House =

Historic house in Minnesota, United States

- U.S. National Register of Historic Places
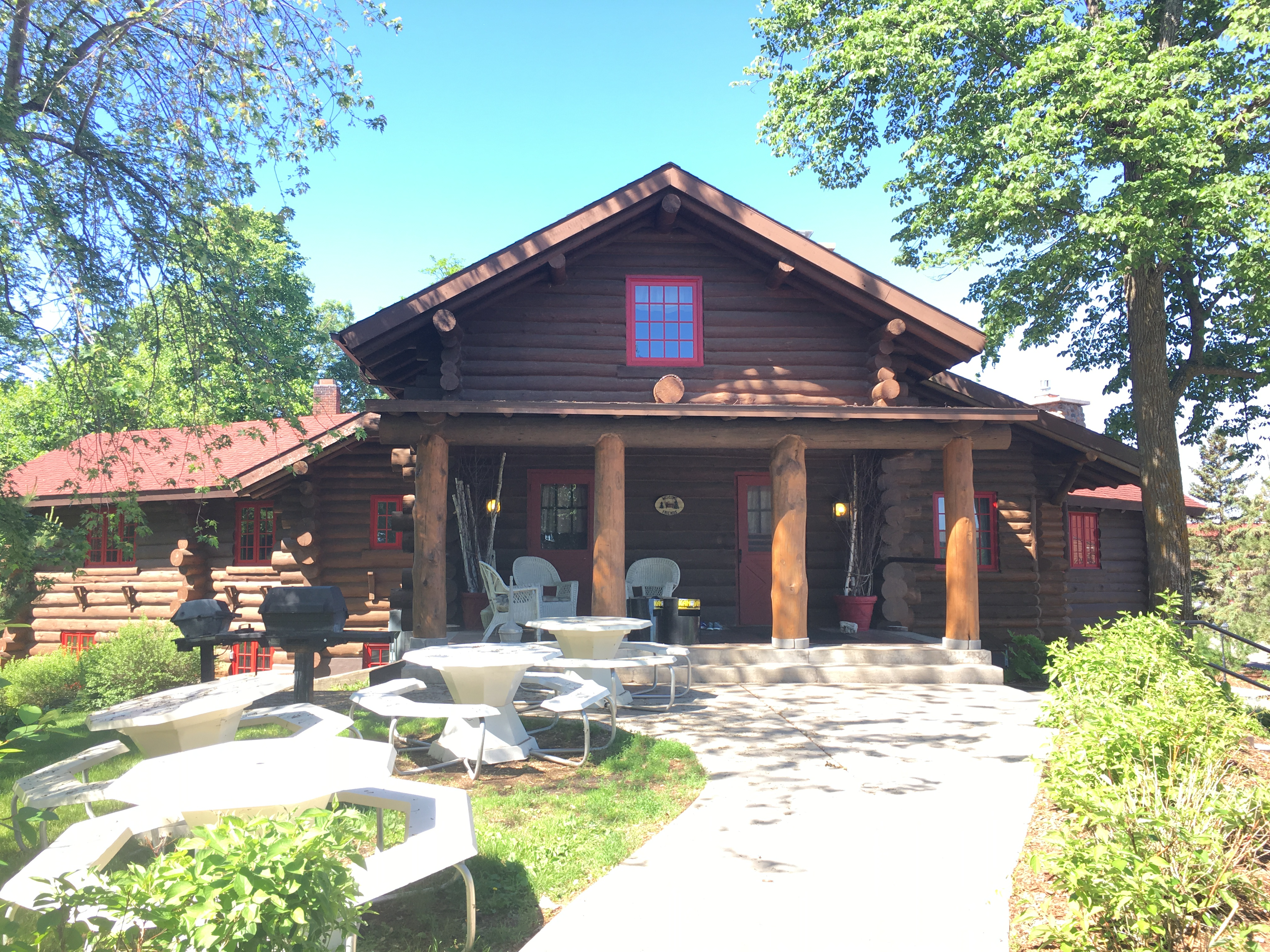

- Location within Minnesota Location within the United States
- Location: Off Co. Hwy. 4 Breezy Point, Minnesota
- Coordinates: 46°35′24″N 94°12′28″W
- Area: less than one acre
- Built: 1922
- Architect: Magney & Tussler
- Architectural style: Swiss Chateau
- NRHP reference No.: 80002036
- Added to NRHP: May 23, 1980

The Wilford H. Fawcett House is a house in Breezy Point, Minnesota, United States, listed on the National Register of Historic Places. Wilford H. Fawcett, also known as "Captain Billy", started the book "Captain Billy's Whiz Bang" as a joke book for soldiers during World War I. He formed Fawcett Publications in 1919 in Robbinsdale, Minnesota. In 1920, he bought a tract of land where the present-day Breezy Point Resort is located, and he began building cottages and a large log lodge. The lodge has since burnt down. He built the Fawcett House as a private residence within the resort property. Fawcett hired the Minneapolis architects of Magney and Tusler and commissioned the design in the Swiss Chateau style. The rustic log style was a bit ironic, since the local logging industry had declined before the resort was built. The house is located on a point on Breezy Point Bay on Big Pelican Lake. It has a "Y" shape. The center of the "Y" has a circular staircase leading to a "reading balcony" in the main hall. The building is constructed of peeled and trimmed Norway pine logs, with brown stain on the exterior and varnished on the interior. The center hall contains the "reading balcony", a large stone masonry fireplace, exposed logs for the rafter beams, and wrought iron fixtures. The remainder of the house has room for about 30 guests. In 1979, a fire damaged several rooms in the northwest wing, but the exterior was unharmed. While the interior has been modernized somewhat, it remains sympathetic to the original.
