= Parsons King Johnson =

American politician

Personal details
- Born: May 8, 1816; Brandon, Vermont, U.S.
- Died: November 23, 1907 (aged 91); Saint Paul, Minnesota, U.S.
- Occupation: Pioneer

Parsons King Johnson (May 8, 1816 – November 23, 1907) was an American pioneer.

Born in Brandon, Vermont, he settled in St. Paul, Minnesota Territory in 1849. He was the first person to settle in what is now Mankato, Minnesota. He served in the Minnesota Territorial House of Representatives in 1849 and 1856. Johnson was a tailor. His brother-in-law was Henry Jackson; his grandson was Frank B. Johnson. Johnson died in St. Paul, Minnesota.
