= WZFJ =

Contemporary Christian music radio station in Breezy Point–Brainerd, Minnesota

Coordinates: 46°36′13″N 94°15′04″W

- Breezy Point, Minnesota; United States
- Broadcast area: Brainerd, Minnesota; Aitkin, Minnesota
- Frequency: 104.3 MHz
- Branding: 104.3 The Pulse

Programming
- Format: Christian Contemporary Music

Ownership
- Owner: Minnesota Christian Broadcasters, Inc.
- Sister stations: KTIG, KCFB, KFNK

History
- First air date: June 14, 1984
- Former call signs: KLKS (1984–2012)
- Former frequencies: 95.3 MHz (1984–1991)

Technical information
- Licensing authority: FCC
- Facility ID: 36401
- Class: C2
- ERP: 50,000 watts
- HAAT: 150 meters (490 ft)

Links
- Public license information: Public file; LMS
- Webcast: Listen live
- Website: thepulse.mn

WZFJ is a radio station airing a contemporary Christian music format licensed to Breezy Point, Minnesota, broadcasting on 104.3 FM. The station serves the areas of Brainerd and Aitkin, Minnesota, and is owned by Minnesota Christian Broadcasters, Inc.

== History ==
The station began broadcasting on June 14, 1984, and originally broadcast at 95.3 MHz, holding the call sign KLKS. The station was owned by Lakes Broadcasting Group. In 1991, the station's frequency was changed to 104.3 MHz. As KLKS, the station aired an adult standards format.

In 2012, the station was purchased for $350,000 by Minnesota Christian Broadcasters, which moved the Christian contemporary programming of WZFJ "The Pulse" to the station from 100.1 MHz. The KLKS call sign moved to 100.1 MHz, which was temporarily taken silent.
