= Frank B. Johnson (politician) =

American druggist and politician

Frank B. Johnson (November 13, 1894 – February 5, 1949) was an American druggist and politician.

Born in Brainerd, Minnesota, Johnson served in the United States Army during World War I. Johnson went to the University of Minnesota and became a druggist. He served on the Brainerd City Council and was mayor of Brainerd. His grandfather was Parsons King Johnson. He served in the Minnesota House of Representatives from 1947 until his death. He died in Brainerd of a heart attack.
