= KTIG =

Christian radio station in Pequot Lakes, Minnesota

Coordinates: 46°40′48″N 94°25′02″W

- Pequot Lakes, Minnesota; United States
- Broadcast area: Brainerd, Minnesota; Staples, Minnesota
- Frequency: 102.7 MHz
- Branding: The Word

Programming
- Format: Christian radio

Ownership
- Owner: Minnesota Christian Broadcasters, Inc.
- Sister stations: KCFB, WZFJ, KFNK

History
- First air date: April 30, 1978

Technical information
- Licensing authority: FCC
- Facility ID: 42903
- Class: C2
- ERP: 40,000 watts
- HAAT: 165 meters (541 ft)

Links
- Public license information: Public file; LMS
- Webcast: Listen live
- Website: theword.mn

KTIG is a Christian radio station licensed to Pequot Lakes, Minnesota, United States, broadcasting on 102.7 FM. The station serves the areas of Brainerd and Staples, and is owned by Minnesota Christian Broadcasters, Inc.

== Programming ==
KTIG's programming includes Christian talk and teaching shows such as Truth for Life with Alistair Begg, Turning Point with David Jeremiah, Insight For Living with Chuck Swindoll, Revive Our Hearts with Nancy DeMoss Wolgemuth, In Touch with Dr. Charles Stanley, Focus on the Family and In the Market with Janet Parshall. KTIG also airs a variety of Christian music.

== History ==
KTIG began broadcasting on April 30, 1978, and originally broadcast on 100.1 MHz FM, running 3,000 watts. In 1990, KTIG increased power to 6,000 watts, and in 1994 the station changed frequencies to 102.7 FM and increased power to 40,000 watts.

== Translators ==
Broadcast translator for KTIG-FM
| Call sign | Frequency | City of license | FID | ERP (W) | Class | FCC info |
|---|---|---|---|---|---|---|
| K240BI | 95.9 FM | Park Rapids, Minnesota | 26636 | 30 | D | LMS |
