= Brainerd Public Library =

- U.S. National Register of Historic Places
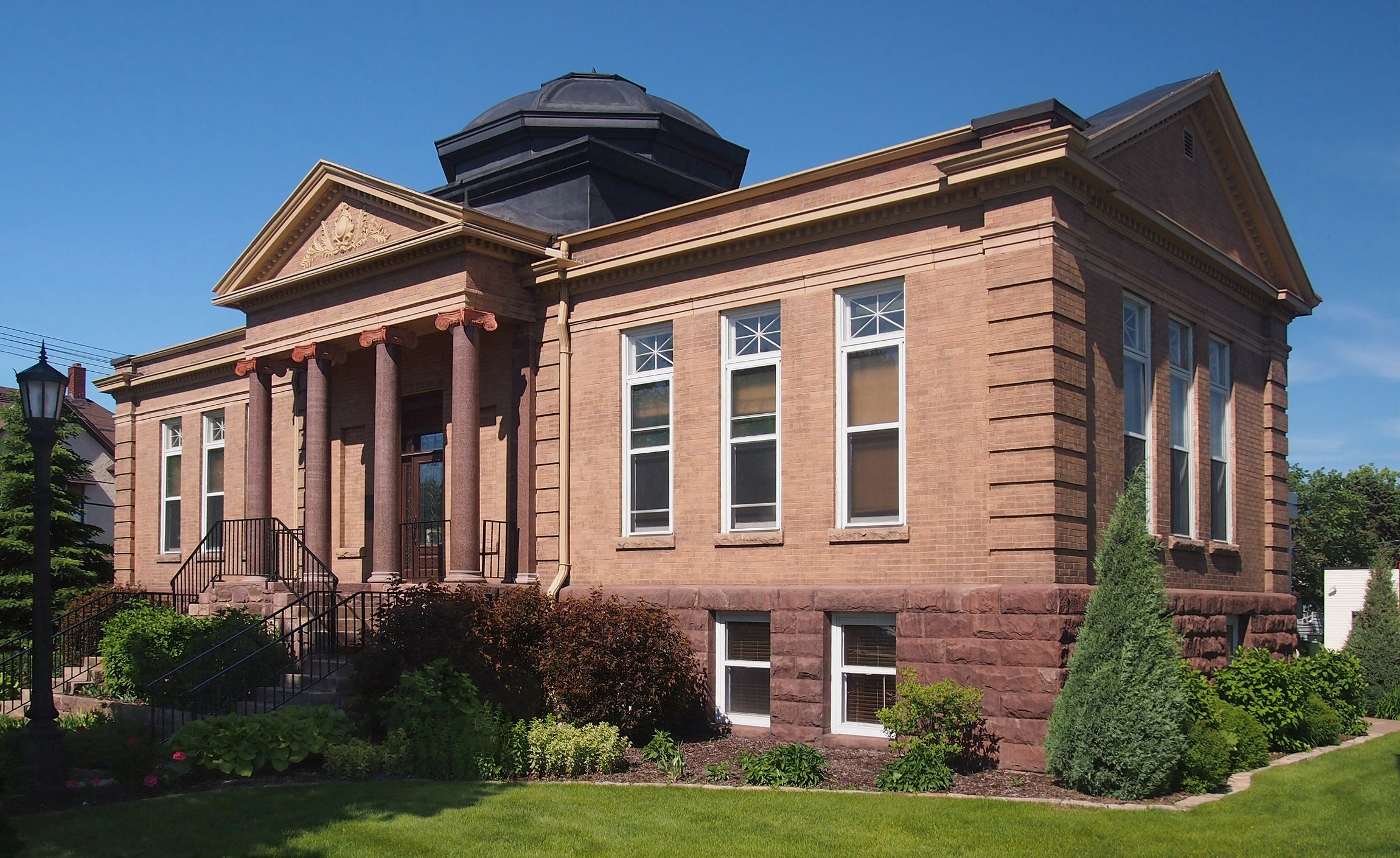
- The former Brainerd Public Library from the southwest

- Location within Minnesota Location within the United States
- Location: Brainerd, Minnesota
- Coordinates: 46°21′30.2″N 94°11′56″W
- Area: less than one acre
- Built: 1904
- Architectural style: Classical Revival
- NRHP reference No.: 80002022
- Added to NRHP: May 23, 1980

The historic Brainerd Public Library is a Carnegie library built in 1904. The building is located at 206 7th Street North in Brainerd, Minnesota, United States, and is in the Classical Revival architectural style using granite and brick. The façade of the building features a portico with four columns holding up a pedimented gable. Although the building was originally a library, it later was used briefly as an antiques store, and is currently a law office.

The Brainerd Public Library is now located at 416 S 5th Street in a building constructed in 1986.
