= Burlington Northern (Brainerd/Baxter) =

Superfund site in Minnesota

Coordinates: 46°21′12″N 94°13′27″W

- Superfund site
- Location: Brainerd and Baxter, Crow Wing County, Minnesota

Information
- Contaminants: unlined creosote and fuel oil lagoons
- Responsible parties: Burlington Northern

Progress

The 70-acre Burlington Northern (Brainerd/Baxter Plant) is a former railroad tie treatment plant by Burlington Northern Railroad in northern Minnesota, USA. The unlined creosote and fuel oil lagoons, which had been used to treat the ties, contaminated groundwater. In 1985, the site was listed as a United States Environmental Protection Agency (EPA) Superfund. Contaminated soils were excavated and capped and a groundwater gradient pump-out well is in place.

== Location ==
Burlington Northern (Brainerd/Baxter Plant) is located on the boundary between the cities of Brainerd and Baxter, in Crow Wing County, Minnesota, in an area south of the Paul Bunyan State Trail and State Highway 210 and north of West Laurel Street (formerly Florence Street). The Mississippi River flows approximately 3,000 feet east of the site. The site is bordered by commercial and light industrial areas to the north and southwest and by residential areas to the south and southeast.

== History ==
The site was operated by Burlington Northern Railroad and historical usage included railroad tie treatment, loading and unloading of ties and timbers, and timber storage. Several rail lines are still active through the area. The tie treating plant operated on the property between 1907 and 1985 and treated railroad ties with creosote and fuel oil. Wastewater generated from the wood-treating process was sent to two shallow, unlined ponds. This created a sludge which contaminated both the underlying soils and the groundwater with creosote and polynuclear aromatic hydrocarbons (PAHs).

== Threats and contaminants ==
Prior to the operation of the groundwater treatment system, contaminated groundwater threatened private water wells, and surface water was at risk from contamination with carcinogenic and non-carcinogenic PAHs, oil and grease, salts, and phenols. Soils at the site were also heavily contaminated prior to removal and treatment.

== Cleanup ==
Burlington Northern signed an administrative order on consent with the U.S. EPA and the Minnesota Pollution Control Agency (MPCA) in 1985. Prior to that time, wastewater and liquid creosote had been removed from a lagoon and transported to a wastewater treatment plant and additional creosote was reused by an on-site plant. The remedy selected by EPA included on-site treatment and capping of remaining contaminated soils and sludges, and a groundwater gradient control system to address contaminated groundwater by using groundwater pump-out wells.

Visibly contaminated soils and sludges were excavated from the site and placed in the on-site treatment area. After a pilot study was completed, Burlington Northern operated the soil treatment area from 1987 to 1994. After treatment, about 14,000 cubic yards of contaminated soil were placed in a lined cell onsite which was closed in 1995. The containment cell currently operates under a Resource Conservation and Recovery Act permit issued by MPCA.

The groundwater pump-out system was constructed in 1985 and pumped contaminated groundwater from three wells to a storm sewer. A pilot groundwater aeration (air injection) system was added in 1992 to augment the pump-out system. Additional air injection wells were placed in operation in 1995 to aerate the width of the contaminant plume while pumping continued. From 2001 to 2008, various combinations of pumping and air injection were used to control groundwater. Since 2008, an expanded air injection system has been used alone to control and treat contaminants in groundwater.

The Superfund program conducts periodic Five-Year Reviews to evaluate whether the remedy remains protective. The latest Five Year Review, completed in December 2011, documented that the remedy as currently operating is protective in the short-term and that the groundwater plume which exceeds drinking water standards has decreased significantly in size. However, the 2011 review also raised issues should be addressed to ensure long-term protection related to soil, groundwater, and the containment unit. EPA has been reviewing how the issues are best to be addressed at the site.

== See also ==
- List of Superfund sites in Minnesota
- Burlington Northern Railroad
