= Crow Wing County Courthouse and Jail =

- Crow Wing County Historic Courthouse and Jail
- U.S. National Register of Historic Places
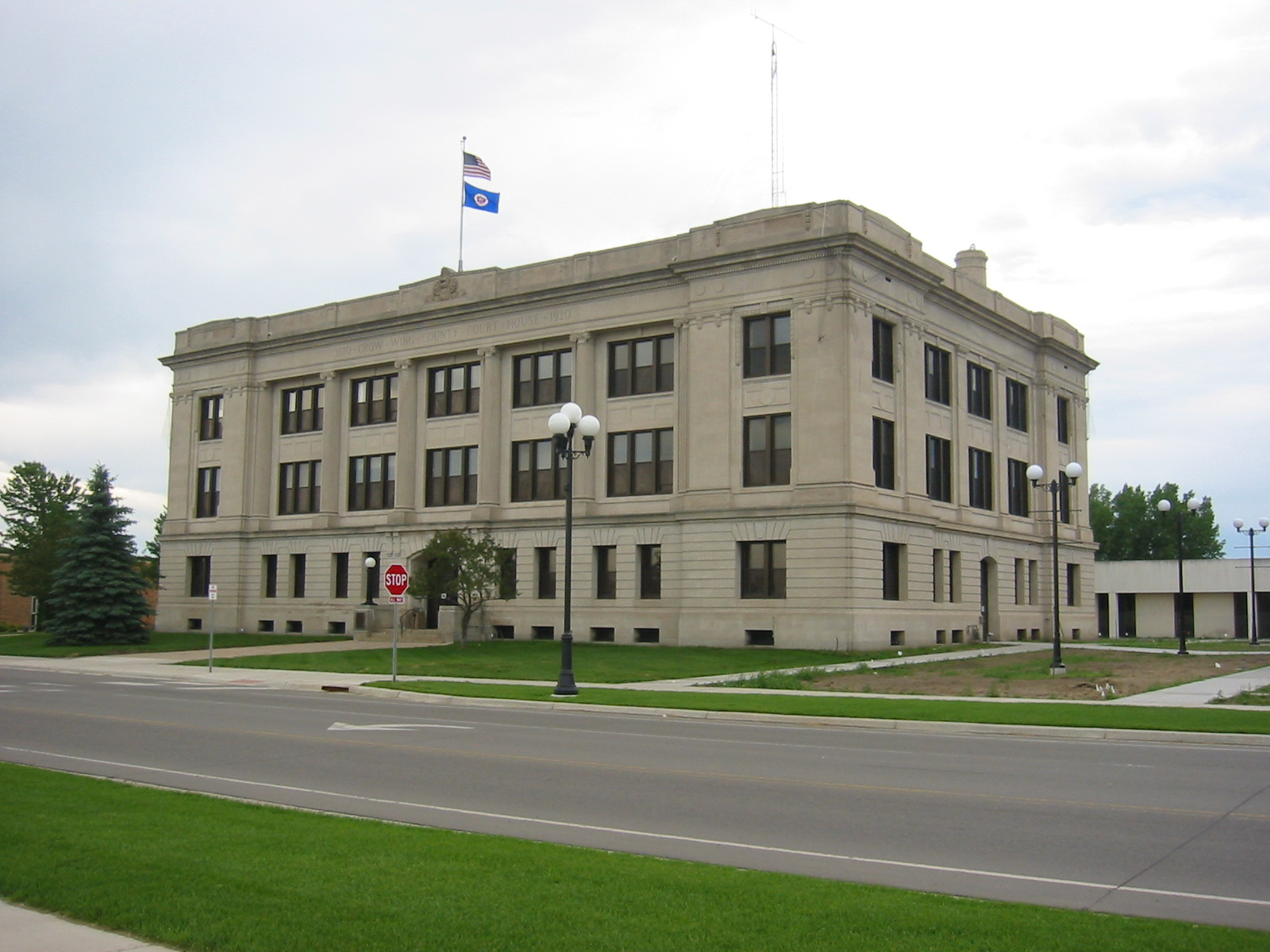

- Location within Minnesota Location within the United States
- Interactive map showing the location for Crow Wing County Courthouse
- Location: 326 Laurel St. Brainerd, Minnesota
- Coordinates: 46°21′19.04″N 94°12′14.28″W
- Built: 1916
- Architect: Tyler J. Roden
- Architectural style: Beaux-Arts
- NRHP reference No.: 80002023
- Added to NRHP: May 23, 1980

The Crow Wing Historic County Courthouse, in Brainerd, Minnesota, United States, is a Beaux-Arts courthouse built in 1920. The building, along with its adjoining jail, are listed on the National Register of Historic Places.

The Beaux-Arts style was popular in the first quarter of the 20th century for Minnesota courthouses. The first floor has a rough-cut stone exterior, while the floors above are built of smooth-cut gray stone. The interior has polished marble floors and walls, with a rotunda surrounded by a balcony. The dome has both a colored glass skylight and a fine brass electrolier.

The Crow Wing Historical Society Museum is located in the former sheriff's residence and jail.

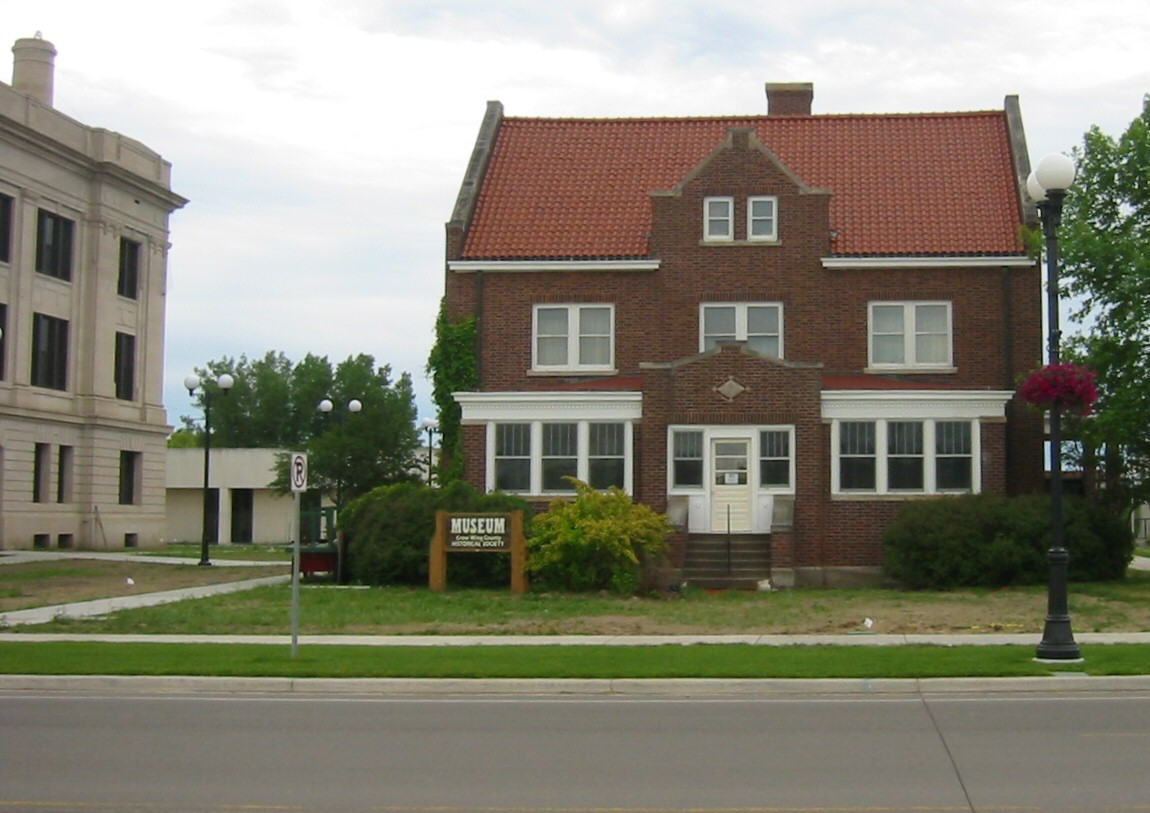
The jail building is just west of the courthouse.

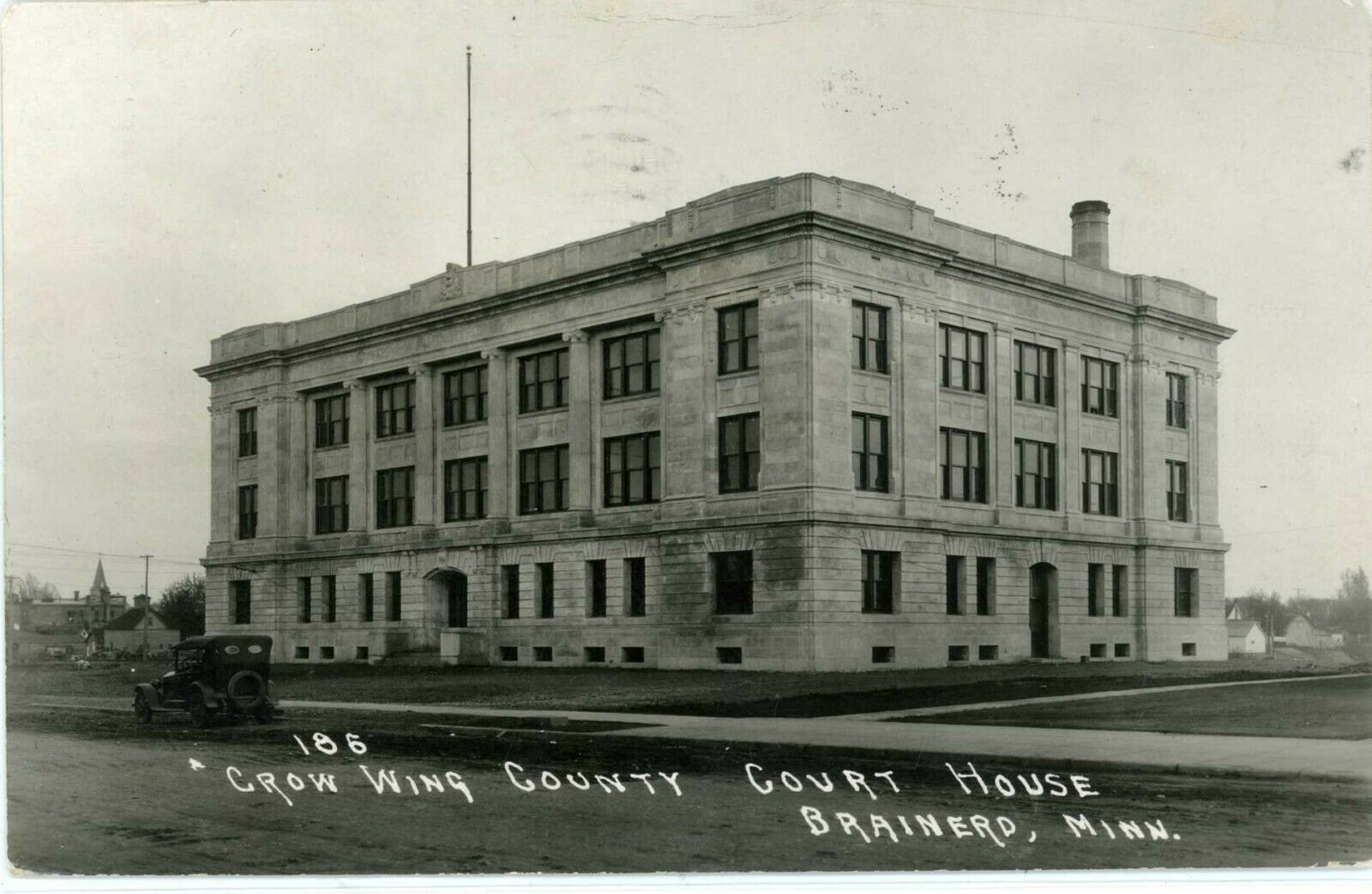
The jail building was pictured in a postcard mailed in 1922.
