= Parker Building (Brainerd, Minnesota) =

- U.S. National Register of Historic Places
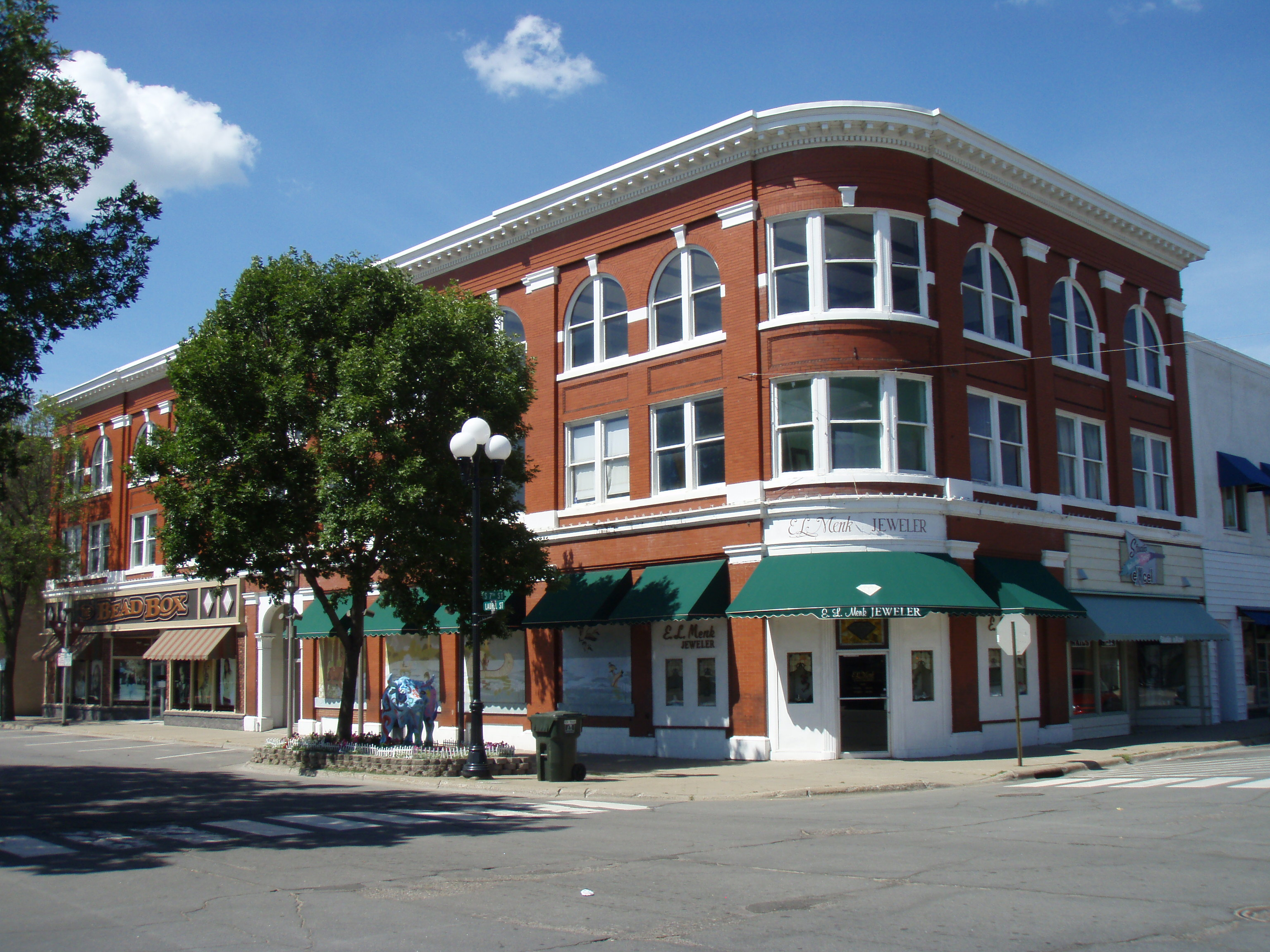
- Parker Building, 2008

- Location within Minnesota Location within the United States
- Location: 623 Laurel St., Brainerd, Minnesota
- Coordinates: 46°21′21″N 94°11′57″W
- Area: less than one acre
- Built: 1909
- Architectural style: Romanesque
- NRHP reference No.: 80002025
- Added to NRHP: May 23, 1980

The Parker Building (also known as Citizens State Bank) is a historic commercial building located in Brainerd, Minnesota.

== Description and history ==
The Romanesque style, three-story building was built in 1909 by the Parker-Dunn Corporation, mainly to serve the 1889-organized Citizens State Bank (Charles N. Parker was vice president), but it was also home to a piano store and, in its basement, a barber shop. It was deemed significant "as a virtually unaltered example of the commercial block style from the turn-of-the-[20th]-century era".

Since 1984, it has housed E.L. Menk Jewelers, whose website has some interesting historical information about the building:

“In 1920, Con O’Brien bought the building, apparently for 45,000.00. In 1924, the bank across the street to the south failed. One local story is that Con O’Brien had a son that was the black sheep of the family who showed up at his dad’s office in the middle of the day and told his dad that he was fired from the Citizens bank. Con then canceled the banks lease and the bank moved across the street in 1927.

In the early 1980s, Jon Rappaport bought the building and land on a contract for deed. The upper two floors have been unoccupied since the winter of 1983 because the boiler system failed. Mr. Rappaport turned back the building in early 1988. At that time, Ed and Susan Menk bought the building. Since then, the main floor has been occupied by various businesses.”

It was listed on the National Register of Historic Places on May 23, 1980.
