= Ronald Everson =

American politician (1930–2024)

Ron Everson

Member of the Minnesota House of Representatives
- In office January 3, 1961 – January 4, 1971
- Constituency: 51st district (1961–1963); 54th district (1963–1967) district 54B (1967–1971)

Personal details
- Born: July 8, 1930 Brainerd, Minnesota, U.S.
- Died: November 21, 2024 (aged 94) North Oaks, Minnesota, U.S.
- Party: Conservative
- Spouse: Jerrie Lee
- Children: 5
- Education: University of Minnesota
- Occupation: Automobile dealer

Ronald Albin Everson (July 8, 1930 – November 21, 2024) was an American politician in the state of Minnesota. He served in the Minnesota House of Representatives from 1961 to 1971. He was an automobile dealer. Everson died in North Oaks, Minnesota, on November 21, 2024, at the age of 94.
