= Minnesota Christian Broadcasters =

Coordinates: 46°36′29″N 94°19′3″W

Minnesota Christian Broadcasters, Inc., known as MCBI, is a regional Christian radio network ministry based in Pequot Lakes, Minnesota, United States. The ministry operates KCFB (91.5 FM) in St. Cloud, Minnesota, and KTIG (102.7 FM) and WZFJ (104.3 FM) in Breezy Point, Minnesota. KTIG is rebroadcast on a translator at 95.9 FM (K240BI) in the Park Rapids, Minnesota area.

KTIG and KCFB air a mixture of talk programming and Adult Contemporary Christian music as well as Gospel, Inspirational, and Traditional Christian music in various dayparts through the week. WZFJ is branded as "104.3 The Pulse", and airs primarily contemporary Christian music.

Minnesota Christian Broadcasters is buying KFNK/89.5 (Franklin, Minnesota) from South Central Oklahoma Christian Broadcasting for $21,000, according to an asset purchase agreement filed with the FCC.

KFNK and other stations owned by South Central Oklahoma Christian Broadcasting went silent earlier this year, saying they could not receive enough donations to stay on the air. The station is licensed for 100 Watts, the minimum for a full-power station, serving a small area east of Redwood Falls, Minnesota.
