= KKIN-FM =

- Aitkin, Minnesota; United States
- Broadcast area: Aitkin, Minnesota; Aitkin County, Minnesota
- Frequency: 94.3 MHz
- Branding: Real Country 94.3 KKIN

Programming
- Format: Country music
- Affiliations: AP News

Ownership
- Owner: Jimmy D. Birkemeyer; (R & J Broadcasting, Inc.)
- Sister stations: KFGI, KKIN, KLKS, WWWI, WWWI-FM

History
- First air date: January 3, 1972
- Former call signs: KKIN-FM (1971–1972); KEZZ (1972–1996)

Technical information
- Licensing authority: FCC
- Facility ID: 69485
- Class: C3
- Power: 14,000 watts
- HAAT: 133 meters (436 ft)
- Transmitter coordinates: 46°41′18″N 93°35′58″W

Links
- Public license information: Public file; LMS
- Webcast: Listen live
- Website: rjbroadcasting.com/kkin-kfgi-wwwi-klks/

KKIN-FM (94.3 MHz) is a country music formatted broadcast radio station licensed to Aitkin, Minnesota, serving Aitkin and Aitkin County, Minnesota. Established in 1972, KKIN-FM is owned and operated by Jimmy D. Birkemeyer's R & J Broadcasting.

== History ==
KKIN-FM signed on January 3, 1972; later that year, the call letters were changed to KEZZ. The KKIN-FM call sign returned on August 16, 1996.

On September 16, 2016, Red Rock Radio announced that it would sell KKIN-FM to R & J Broadcasting as part of an eight station deal; the sale was completed on December 21, 2016.

== Programming ==
KKIN-FM also airs local, state, and national sporting events, and has shows such as Community Connection on Weekday mornings.
