= KKIN (AM) =

- Aitkin, Minnesota; United States
- Broadcast area: Aitkin, Minnesota; Aitkin County, Minnesota
- Frequency: 930 kHz (C-QUAM AM Stereo)
- Branding: The Gobbler

Programming
- Format: Oldies, classic hits, adult standards

Ownership
- Owner: Jimmy D. Birkemeyer; (R & J Broadcasting, Inc.)
- Sister stations: KFGI, KKIN-FM, KLKS, WWWI, WWWI-FM

History
- First air date: June 1, 1961; 64 years ago

Technical information
- Licensing authority: FCC
- Facility ID: 69484
- Class: B
- Power: 2,500 watts daytime; 360 watts nighttime
- Transmitter coordinates: 46°32′26″N 93°39′22″W
- Translator: 103.1 K276GQ (Aitkin)

Links
- Public license information: Public file; LMS
- Webcast: Listen live
- Website: rjbroadcasting.com/kkin-kfgi-wwwi-klks/

KKIN (930 AM) is an oldies/classic hits/adult standards formatted broadcast radio station licensed to Aitkin, Minnesota, serving Aitkin and Aitkin County, Minnesota. Established in 1961, KKIN is owned and operated by Jimmy D. Birkemeyer's R & J Broadcasting.

== History ==
KKIN started out as a station that plays old time country music from the 1940s to the 1970s with such artists as Willie Nelson, Johnny Cash, and Hank Williams. Now that is the music that is played on KKIN-FM (94.3 FM). Around circa the mid-1990s, in spite of the increase of older people in the area, the station had switched to an adult standards format. The station was built around 1961 by Fred Moegle, who previously had his own children's show called The Fred Moegle Show that aired for a few years in the 1950s before moving his family to Aitkin, Minnesota, and building KKIN. Fred ran the station for several years.

KKIN was an affiliate of America's Best Music and Music Of Your Life format. In recent years, c. 2010, the format changed to feature less big bands and traditional standards, to a more or less oldies/soft adult contemporary format playing softer music that was popular from the 1960s to today that is targeted to the more mature listening audience, age 45 and older. Some 1940s and 1950s music is still played on KKIN but it is not as prominent as it was in the previous decades.

The station is also one of the few in the country that is still broadcasting in AM Stereo.

On August 4, 2014, KKIN changed their format to sports, with programming from NBC Sports Radio. On September 16, 2016, Red Rock Radio announced that it would sell KKIN to R & J Broadcasting as part of an eight station deal; the sale was completed on December 21, 2016.

On August 1, 2017, KKIN changed their format from sports to adult standards. In late 2019, KKIN along with its FM translator 103.1 FM has rebranded itself once again as "The Gobbler", playing oldies and classic hits from the 1950s, 1960s, and 1970s.

== History of call letters ==
The call letters KKIN were previously assigned to an AM station in Visalia, California. It broadcast on 1400 kHz.
