= Franklin, Minnesota =

City in Minnesota, United States

Franklin
- City
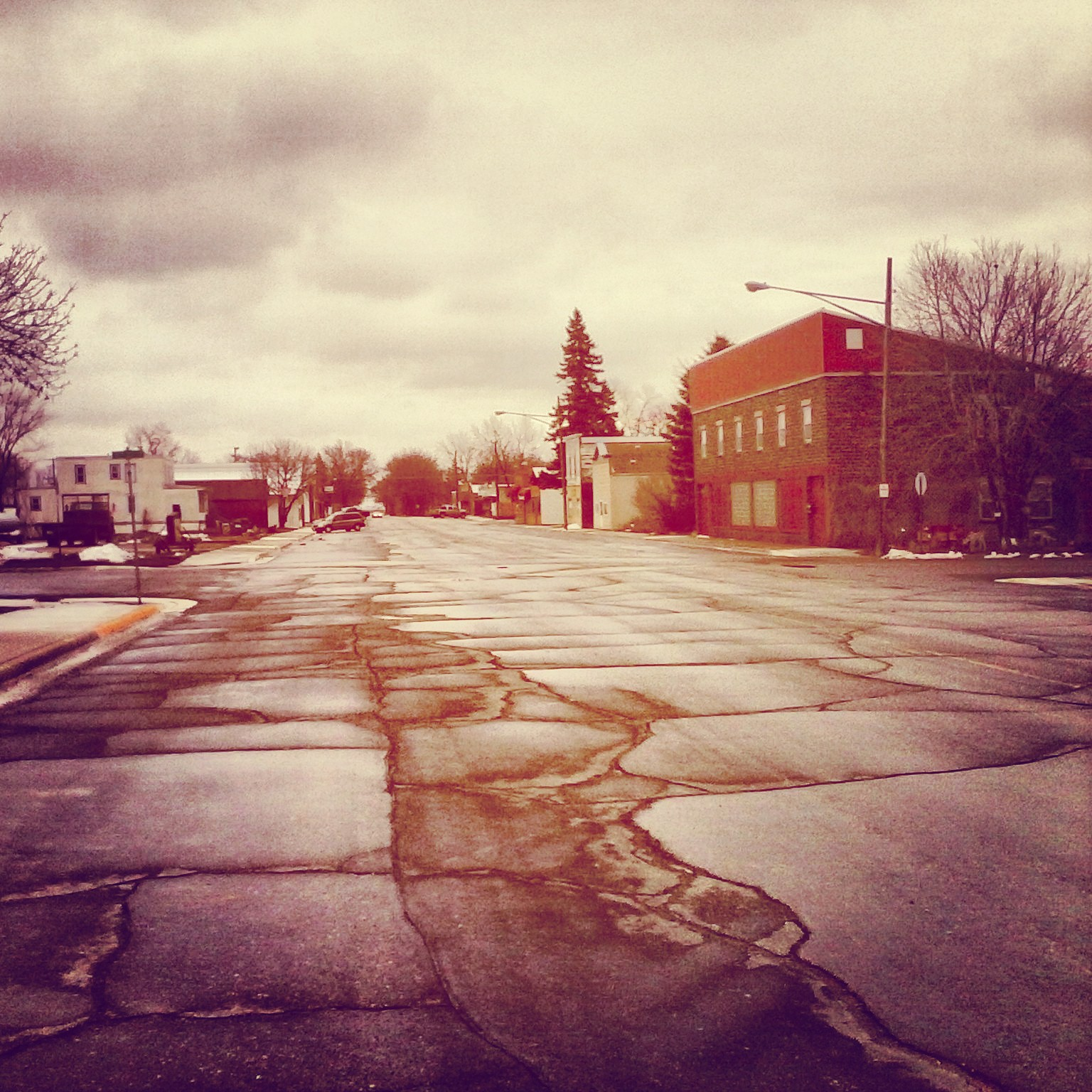
- Businesses on 2nd Avenue

- Location of Franklin, Minnesota
- Coordinates: 44°31′50″N 94°53′03″W
- Country: United States
- State: Minnesota
- County: Renville

Area
  - Total: 1.00 sq mi (2.60 km^{2})
  - Land: 1.00 sq mi (2.60 km^{2})
  - Water: 0 sq mi (0.00 km^{2})
- Elevation: 1,011 ft (308 m)

Population (2020)
  - Total: 493
  - Density: 490.4/sq mi (189.34/km^{2})
- Time zone: UTC-6 (Central (CST))
  - Summer (DST): UTC-5 (CDT)
- ZIP code: 55333
- Area code: 507
- FIPS code: 27-22364
- GNIS feature ID: 2394809
- Website: https://franklinmn.us/

Franklin is a city in Renville County, Minnesota, United States. As of the 2020 census, Franklin had a population of 493.

== History ==
Franklin was platted in 1882. The city was named for Benjamin Franklin.

The 1862 Battle of Redwood Ferry took place just outside what would later become the town of Franklin.

== Geography ==
According to the United States Census Bureau, the city has a total area of 1.08 square miles (2.80 km^{2}), all land.

Franklin is located on Minnesota State Highway 19, east of U.S. Route 71.

== Demographics ==
Historical population
Census	Pop.	Note	%±
1890	284		—
1900	439		54.6%
1910	439		0.0%
1920	510		16.2%
1930	535		4.9%
1940	502		−6.2%
1950	546		8.8%
1960	548		0.4%
1970	557		1.6%
1980	512		−8.1%
1990	441		−13.9%
2000	498		12.9%
2010	510		2.4%
2020	493		−3.3%
U.S. Decennial Census

=== 2010 census ===
As of the census of 2010, there were 510 people, 207 households, and 120 families living in the city. The population density was 472.2 inhabitants per square mile (182.3/km^{2}). There were 230 housing units at an average density of 213.0 per square mile (82.2/km^{2}). The racial makeup of the city was 93.1% White, 0.2% African American, 1.4% Native American, 1.6% Asian, and 3.7% from two or more races. Hispanic or Latino of any race were 1.8% of the population.

There were 207 households, of which 28.5% had children under the age of 18 living with them, 41.5% were married couples living together, 12.1% had a female householder with no husband present, 4.3% had a male householder with no wife present, and 42.0% were non-families. 38.2% of all households were made up of individuals, and 20.3% had someone living alone who was 65 years of age or older. The average household size was 2.24 and the average family size was 2.98.

The median age in the city was 47.1 years. 24.5% of residents were under the age of 18; 6% were between the ages of 18 and 24; 15.8% were from 25 to 44; 32.1% were from 45 to 64; and 21.6% were 65 years of age or older. The gender makeup of the city was 49.4% male and 50.6% female.

=== 2000 census ===
As of the census of 2000, there were 498 people, 195 households, and 124 families living in the city. The population density was 458.6 inhabitants per square mile (177.1/km^{2}). There were 217 housing units at an average density of 199.8 per square mile (77.1/km^{2}). The racial makeup of the city was 96.39% White, 1.00% Native American, 1.20% from other races, and 1.41% from two or more races. Hispanic or Latino of any race were 1.41% of the population.

There were 195 households, out of which 30.3% had children under the age of 18 living with them, 54.4% were married couples living together, 7.7% had a female householder with no husband present, and 36.4% were non-families. 33.8% of all households were made up of individuals, and 17.4% had someone living alone who was 65 years of age or older. The average household size was 2.37 and the average family size was 3.07.

In the city, the population was spread out, with 26.1% under the age of 18, 4.6% from 18 to 24, 23.5% from 25 to 44, 18.5% from 45 to 64, and 27.3% who were 65 years of age or older. The median age was 43 years. For every 100 females, there were 93.8 males. For every 100 females age 18 and over, there were 86.8 males.

The median income for a household in the city was $37,583, and the median income for a family was $40,417. Males had a median income of $32,500 versus $19,659 for females. The per capita income for the city was $16,212. About 5.2% of families and 9.0% of the population were below the poverty line, including 10.8% of those under age 18 and 7.0% of those age 65 or over.

== Attractions ==
Catfish Derby Days is an annual three-day city celebration held on the fourth weekend in July. Events include a contest to catch the biggest catfish, a street dance, Sunday parades, a coed volleyball tournament, a men's 12-team softball tournament, a beanbag tournament, a queen contest/variety show, a chess tournament, a "Kiss the Catfish Contest," music at the park, a raffle, church services, a fire department water ball, and a St. Luke's Lutheran Church-sponsored breakfast.
