= Baxter, Minnesota =

City in Minnesota, United States

Baxter
- City
- Motto: A Growing Community
- Location of the city of Baxter within Crow Wing County in the state of Minnesota
- Coordinates: 46°20′33″N 94°16′46″W
- Country: United States
- State: Minnesota
- County: Crow Wing
- Incorporated: May 25, 1939

Government
  - Mayor: Darrel Olson

Area
  - Total: 21.11 sq mi (54.67 km^{2})
  - Land: 18.85 sq mi (48.83 km^{2})
  - Water: 2.25 sq mi (5.84 km^{2})
- Elevation: 1,194 ft (364 m)

Population (2020)
  - Total: 8,612
  - Estimate (2022): 8,971
  - Density: 456.8/sq mi (176.38/km^{2})
- Time zone: UTC-6 (Central)
  - Summer (DST): UTC-5 (CDT)
- ZIP codes: 56401, 56425
- Area code: 218
- FIPS code: 27-04042
- GNIS feature ID: 2394086
- Website: baxtermn.gov

Baxter is a city in Crow Wing County, Minnesota, United States. The population was 8,612 at the 2020 census. It is part of the Brainerd Micropolitan Statistical Area.

Minnesota State Highways 210 and 371 are two of the main routes in the city.

== Geography ==
Baxter is just north of Minnesota's geographical center, in a terminal moraine area created by the Superior Lobe of the Labradorian ice sheet. The city is home to numerous lakes and ponds.

Baxter is bordered on the west by Cass County and on the east by Brainerd. The Mississippi River marks the southern border but expansion both north and south is possible.

Along with the rest of Crow Wing County and parts of the adjoining counties, Baxter is part of the Brainerd Lakes Area.

According to the United States Census Bureau, the city has an area of 20.62 square miles (53.41 km^{2}), of which 18.39 square miles (47.63 km^{2}) is land and 2.23 square miles (5.78 km^{2}) is water.

== History ==
Baxter owes its existence partly to the 1920s operation of a (since closed) large tie-treating plant, owned by Northern Pacific Railroad. Farming was also an important early industry.

Baxter was incorporated on May 25, 1939. The town is named after Luther Baxter, an attorney for the railroad who served in the Minnesota Legislature and as a colonel in the Civil War.

Tourism and various service industries have become Baxter's biggest employers, and numerous housing subdivisions have been developed in the wooded area west of Minnesota Highway 371, which passes through the town. Owing to the amount of unused land in the area, commercial development along the highway itself has also increased in recent years, though it has tended to conform to the pattern of urban sprawl.

== Superfund site and environmental damage ==
The Burlington Northern (Brainerd/Baxter) United States Environmental Protection Agency Superfund site is on the boundary between Brainerd and Baxter. The site served as a Burlington Northern Railroad tie treatment plant from 1907 to 1985. During that time, wastewater generated from the wood-treating process was sent to two shallow, unlined ponds. This created a sludge that contaminated both the underlying soils and the groundwater with creosote and polynuclear aromatic hydrocarbons (PAHs).

== Demographics ==
Historical population
Census	Pop.	Note	%±
1930	169		—
1940	357		111.2%
1950	507		42.0%
1960	1,037		104.5%
1970	1,556		50.0%
1980	2,625		68.7%
1990	3,695		40.8%
2000	5,555		50.3%
2010	7,610		37.0%
2020	8,612		13.2%
2022 (est.)	8,971		4.2%
U.S. Decennial Census; 2020 Census

=== 2020 census ===
As of the 2020 census, Baxter had a population of 8,612. The median age was 40.6 years. 24.4% of residents were under the age of 18 and 22.0% of residents were 65 years of age or older. For every 100 females there were 92.1 males, and for every 100 females age 18 and over there were 88.1 males age 18 and over.

74.2% of residents lived in urban areas, while 25.8% lived in rural areas.

There were 3,459 households in Baxter, of which 30.6% had children under the age of 18 living in them. Of all households, 52.7% were married-couple households, 13.3% were households with a male householder and no spouse or partner present, and 27.6% were households with a female householder and no spouse or partner present. About 28.2% of all households were made up of individuals and 15.0% had someone living alone who was 65 years of age or older.

There were 3,675 housing units, of which 5.9% were vacant. The homeowner vacancy rate was 0.8% and the rental vacancy rate was 8.1%.

Racial composition as of the 2020 census
Race	Number	Percent
White	7,973	92.6%
Black or African American	64	0.7%
American Indian and Alaska Native	48	0.6%
Asian	107	1.2%
Native Hawaiian and Other Pacific Islander	0	0.0%
Some other race	79	0.9%
Two or more races	341	4.0%
Hispanic or Latino (of any race)	131	1.5%

=== 2010 census ===
As of the census of 2010, there were 7,610 people, 2,963 households, and 2,110 families living in the city. The population density was 413.8 inhabitants per square mile (159.8/km^{2}). There were 3,176 housing units at an average density of 172.7 per square mile (66.7/km^{2}). The racial makeup of the city was 96.5% White, 0.5% African American, 0.5% Native American, 0.9% Asian, 0.1% Pacific Islander, 0.2% from other races, and 1.4% from two or more races. Hispanic or Latino of any race were 1.1% of the population.

There were 2,963 households, of which 35.8% had children under the age of 18 living with them, 59.5% were married couples living together, 7.6% had a female householder with no husband present, 4.1% had a male householder with no wife present, and 28.8% were non-families. 23.8% of all households were made up of individuals, and 11.8% had someone living alone who was 65 years of age or older. The average household size was 2.55 and the average family size was 3.02.

The median age in the city was 38.7 years. 27% of residents were under the age of 18; 7.7% were between the ages of 18 and 24; 23.8% were from 25 to 44; 25.6% were from 45 to 64; and 15.8% were 65 years of age or older. The gender makeup of the city was 48.3% male and 51.7% female.

=== 2000 census ===
As of the census of 2000, there were 5,555 people, 1,921 households, and 1,586 families living in the city. The population density was 320.7 inhabitants per square mile (123.8/km^{2}). There were 1,979 housing units at an average density of 114.3 per square mile (44.1/km^{2}). The racial makeup of the city was 98.63% White, 0.02% African American, 0.22% Native American, 0.41% Asian, 0.09% from other races, and 0.63% from two or more races. Hispanic or Latino of any race were 0.61% of the population. 31.8% were of German, 14.0% Norwegian, 11.3% Swedish, 6.4% Irish and 5.0% English ancestry.

There were 1,921 households, out of which 45.1% had children under the age of 18 living with them, 72.4% were married couples living together, 8.0% had a female householder with no husband present, and 17.4% were non-families. 14.2% of all households were made up of individuals, and 6.1% had someone living alone who was 65 years of age or older. The average household size was 2.87 and the average family size was 3.17.

In the city, the population was spread out, with 31.7% under the age of 18, 6.5% from 18 to 24, 28.6% from 25 to 44, 22.8% from 45 to 64, and 10.4% who were 65 years of age or older. The median age was 36 years. For every 100 females, there were 95.9 males. For every 100 females age 18 and over, there were 90.7 males.

The median income for a household in the city was $52,289, and the median income for a family was $55,838. Males had a median income of $38,375 versus $26,667 for females. The per capita income for the city was $19,772. About 2.3% of families and 5.0% of the population were below the poverty line, including 5.9% of those under age 18 and 3.7% of those age 65 or over.

== Education ==
Baxter's students attend Brainerd Public Schools. The zoned high school is Brainerd High School.

== See also ==
- Burlington Northern (Brainerd/Baxter)
- List of Superfund sites in Minnesota
