= Brainerd, Minnesota =

City in Minnesota, United States

- City
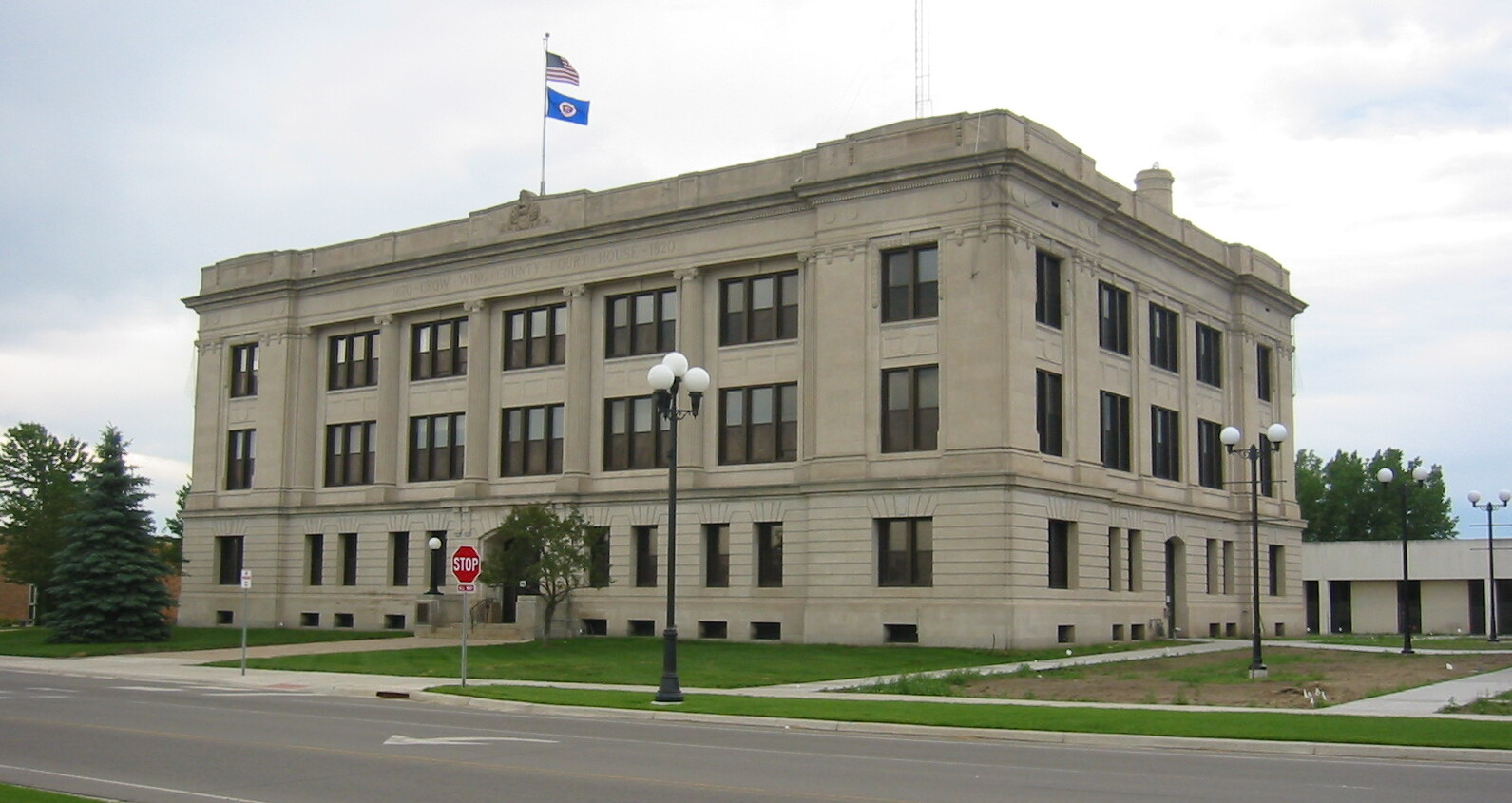
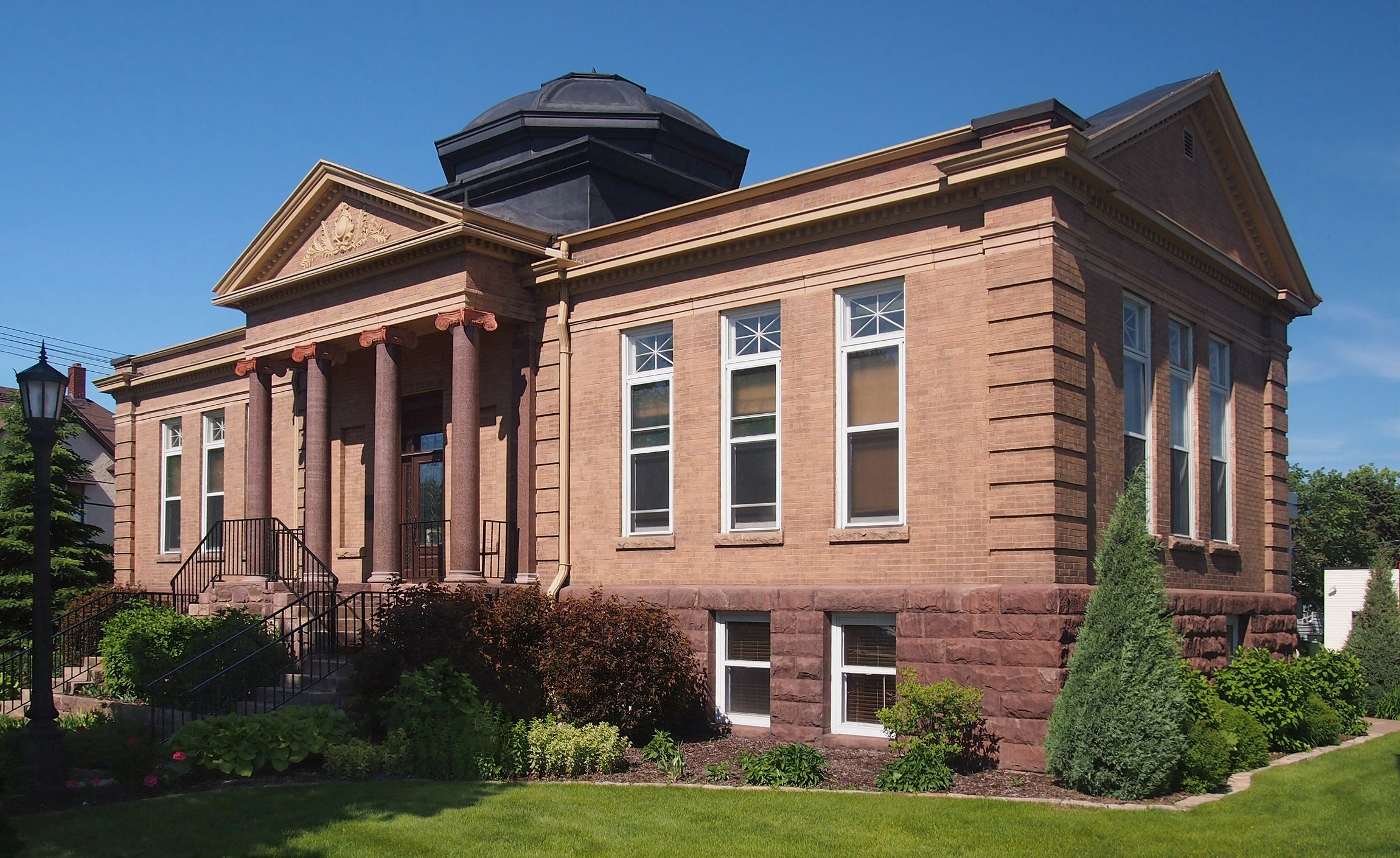
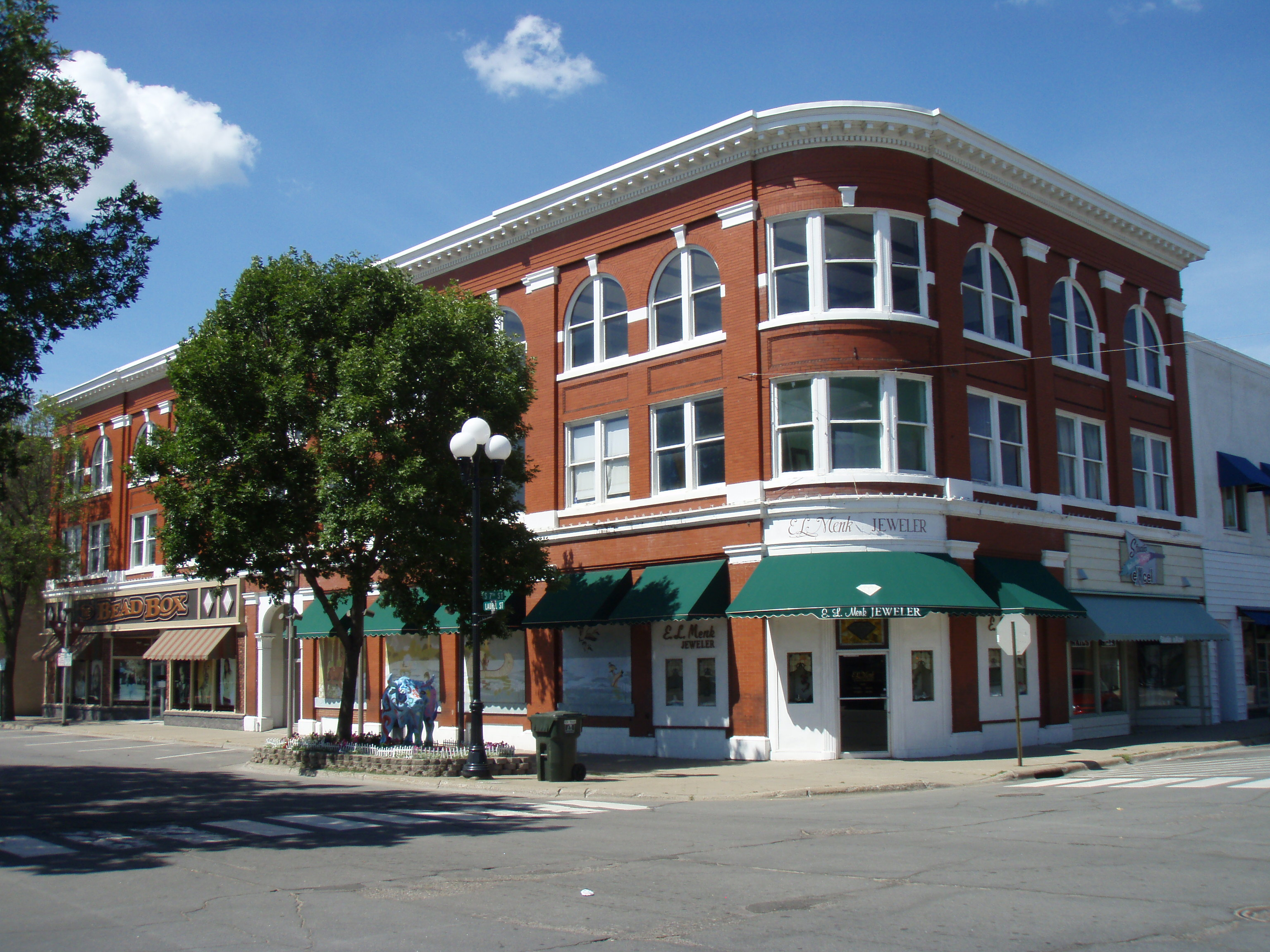
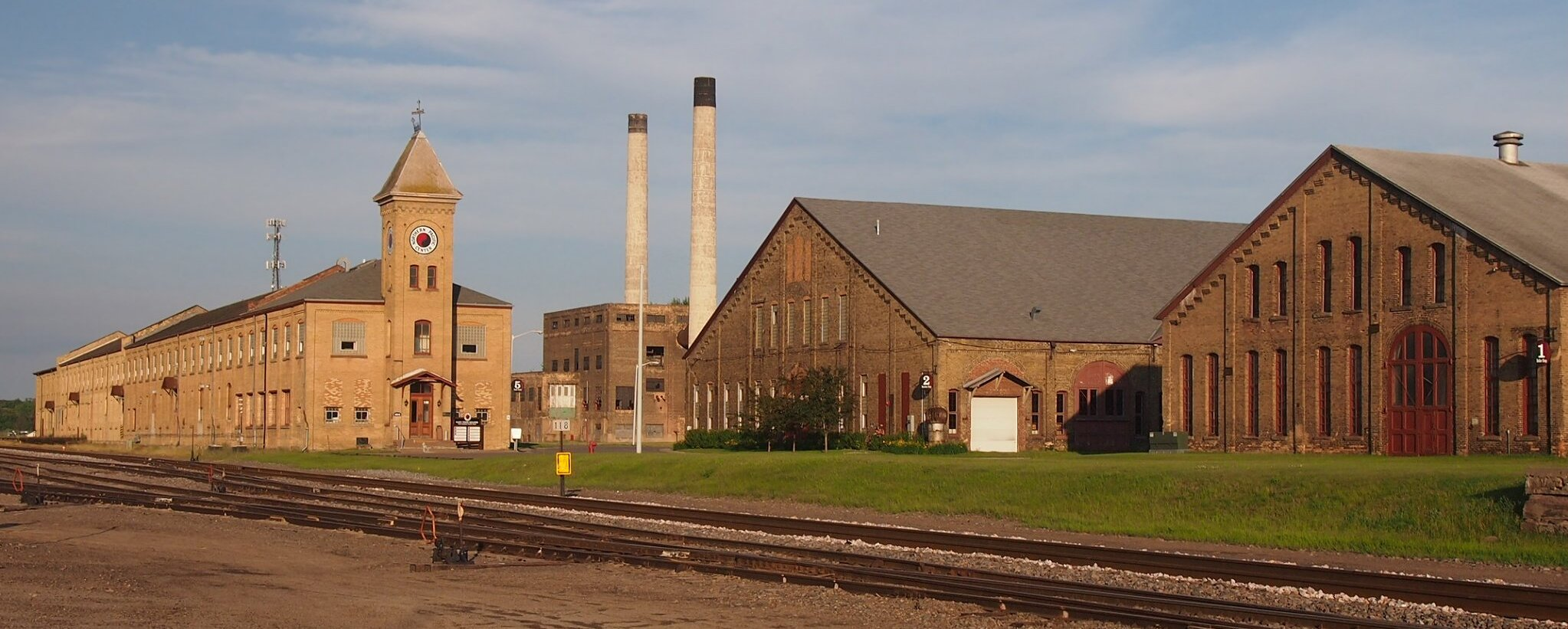
- Crow Wing County Courthouse Brainerd Carnegie Library Parker Building Northern Pacific Railroad Shops Historic District

- Seal

- Location within Crow Wing County

- Location within Minnesota Location within the United States
- Coordinates: 46°21′29″N 94°12′03″W
- Country: United States
- State: Minnesota
- County: Crow Wing
- Founded: 1870
- Incorporated: March 6, 1873

Government
  - Mayor: Dave Badeaux

Area
  - Total: 12.82 sq mi (33.21 km^{2})
  - Land: 12.13 sq mi (31.42 km^{2})
  - Water: 0.69 sq mi (1.79 km^{2}) 5.78%
- Elevation: 1,217 ft (371 m)

Population (2020)
  - Total: 14,395
  - Estimate (2022): 14,580
  - Density: 1,187/sq mi (458.2/km^{2})
- Demonym: Brainerdier
- Time zone: UTC-6 (Central)
  - Summer (DST): UTC-5 (CDT)
- ZIP code: 56401
- Area code: 218
- FIPS code: 27-07300
- GNIS feature ID: 2394238
- Website: Official website

Brainerd (/ˈbreɪnərd/ BRAY-nərd) is a city in and the county seat of Crow Wing County, Minnesota, United States. Its population was 14,395 at the 2020 census. Brainerd straddles the Mississippi River several miles upstream from its confluence with the Crow Wing River, having been founded as a site for a railroad crossing above the confluence.

The Brainerd micropolitan area includes Cass and Crow Wing counties and had a population of 96,189 at the 2020 census. The city is well known for being the partial setting of the 1996 film Fargo.

== History ==
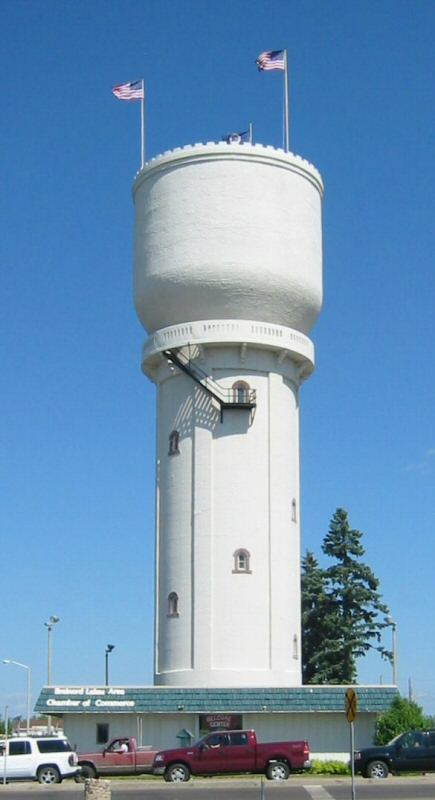
The Brainerd Water Tower is shown on the city's seal

The area that is now Brainerd was formerly Ojibwe territory. Brainerd was first seen by European settlers on Christmas Day in 1805, when Zebulon Pike stopped there while searching for the headwaters of the Mississippi River. Crow Wing Village, a fur and logging community near Fort Ripley, brought settlers to the area in the mid-19th century.

In those early years, the relationship between the settlers and the Native Americans was fraught. The most famous example of this tenuous relationship was the "Blueberry War" of 1872. Two Ojibwe were accused of murdering a missing girl. After they were arrested and jailed, a mob overpowered the sheriff's officers, dragged the suspects from the jail and lynched them. Shortly after these events, a group of Ojibwe approached the town, and troops from Fort Ripley were called in to prevent what residents assumed was a reprisal attack for the lynchings. As it turned out, the Ojibwe only wanted to sell blueberries and the settlers avoided a bloody misunderstanding. The guilt of the two Ojibwe was never proven.

Brainerd was the idea of Northern Pacific railroad president John Gregory Smith, who in 1870 named the township after his wife, Anne Eliza Brainerd Smith, and father-in-law, Lawrence Brainerd. The company built a bridge over the Mississippi seven miles north of Crow Wing Village and used the Brainerd station as a machine and car shop, prompting many to move north and abandon Crow Wing. Brainerd was organized as a city on March 6, 1873.

On January 11, 1876, the state legislature revoked Brainerd's charter for six years, in reaction to the election of local handyman Thomas Lanihan as mayor instead of Judge C.B. Sleeper. Brainerd functioned as a township in the interim.

In 1881, the railroad, and with it the town, expanded. Lumber and paper, as well as agriculture in general, were important early industries, but for many decades Brainerd remained a railroad town: in the 1920s roughly 90% of Brainerd residents were dependent on the railroad. Participation in the nationwide railroad strike on July 1, 1922, left most Brainerd residents unemployed and embittered many of those involved.

On October 27, 1933, the First National Bank of Brainerd became briefly famous when it was held up by Baby Face Nelson and his gang.

Over the years, increased efficiency and the better positioning of the more centralized Livingston, Montana, shops led to a decline in the importance of a railroad station that once employed over 1,000 and serviced locomotives for the whole Northern Pacific line. The BNSF Railway (successor to the Northern Pacific) continues to employ approximately 70 people in Brainerd at a maintenance-of-way equipment shop that repairs and maintains track and equipment. The former Northern Pacific railway station has been converted to breweries, coffee shops, and event centers available to rent for special occasions.

The Northwest Paper Company built Brainerd's first paper mill in 1903 and with the steady increase in tourism since the early 20th century the paper and service industries have become Brainerd's primary employers. The town's coating mill was sold by Potlatch to Missota Paper in 2003 and then by Missota Paper to Wausau Paper in 2004. It is now used as a small industrial center called Brainerd Industrial Center (BIC).

Due to the many lakes in the area, Brainerd is a popular summertime destination for those owning cabins in the area, better known as the Brainerd Lakes. Brainerd itself is now heavily developed into commercial and residential areas and has seen an uptick in development in recent years.

== Geography ==
Brainerd is just north of Minnesota's geographical center, in a relatively hilly terminal moraine area created by the Superior Lobe of the Labradorian ice sheet. The town occupies land on both sides of the Mississippi River, though its older parts are almost all to the east.

Though the city itself has relatively few lakes, there are over 460 lakes within 25 miles (40 km) of Brainerd, mostly to the north. For this reason, Crow Wing County and parts of the adjoining counties are often collectively called the Brainerd Lakes Area despite most of the lakes existing closer to Nisswa.

According to the United States Census Bureau, the city has an area of 12.66 square miles (32.79 km^{2}), of which 11.91 square miles (30.85 km^{2}) is land and 0.73 square miles (1.89 km^{2}) is water.

Brainerd has been assigned ZIP code 56401 by the USPS.

=== Climate ===
Brainerd has a humid continental climate (Köppen Dfb) with vast seasonal differences. Summers are warm, and occasionally hot, with high humidity, whereas winters are often severely cold.

Climate data for Brainerd, Minnesota (1991–2020 normals, extremes 1899–present)
| Month | Jan | Feb | Mar | Apr | May | Jun | Jul | Aug | Sep | Oct | Nov | Dec | Year |
|---|---|---|---|---|---|---|---|---|---|---|---|---|---|
| Record high °F (°C) | 56 (13) | 60 (16) | 80 (27) | 94 (34) | 101 (38) | 100 (38) | 106 (41) | 102 (39) | 103 (39) | 89 (32) | 75 (24) | 61 (16) | 106 (41) |
| Mean maximum °F (°C) | 41.7 (5.4) | 45.1 (7.3) | 60.9 (16.1) | 76.3 (24.6) | 86.6 (30.3) | 90.6 (32.6) | 91.2 (32.9) | 89.7 (32.1) | 85.9 (29.9) | 77.6 (25.3) | 58.9 (14.9) | 43.0 (6.1) | 93.5 (34.2) |
| Mean daily maximum °F (°C) | 19.6 (−6.9) | 25.4 (−3.7) | 38.4 (3.6) | 53.0 (11.7) | 66.6 (19.2) | 75.8 (24.3) | 80.1 (26.7) | 78.4 (25.8) | 69.9 (21.1) | 55.2 (12.9) | 38.3 (3.5) | 24.8 (−4.0) | 52.1 (11.2) |
| Daily mean °F (°C) | 8.8 (−12.9) | 13.2 (−10.4) | 26.6 (−3.0) | 40.9 (4.9) | 54.7 (12.6) | 64.6 (18.1) | 68.9 (20.5) | 66.7 (19.3) | 58.1 (14.5) | 44.5 (6.9) | 29.6 (−1.3) | 16.1 (−8.8) | 41.1 (5.1) |
| Mean daily minimum °F (°C) | −2.0 (−18.9) | 0.9 (−17.3) | 14.8 (−9.6) | 28.8 (−1.8) | 42.8 (6.0) | 53.3 (11.8) | 57.8 (14.3) | 55.0 (12.8) | 46.2 (7.9) | 33.8 (1.0) | 20.8 (−6.2) | 7.4 (−13.7) | 30.0 (−1.1) |
| Mean minimum °F (°C) | −27.0 (−32.8) | −21.4 (−29.7) | −10.5 (−23.6) | 15.1 (−9.4) | 29.2 (−1.6) | 40.2 (4.6) | 46.4 (8.0) | 43.9 (6.6) | 31.0 (−0.6) | 19.9 (−6.7) | 2.3 (−16.5) | −18.2 (−27.9) | −29.8 (−34.3) |
| Record low °F (°C) | −48 (−44) | −54 (−48) | −35 (−37) | −12 (−24) | 16 (−9) | 21 (−6) | 33 (1) | 29 (−2) | 18 (−8) | 3 (−16) | −24 (−31) | −43 (−42) | −54 (−48) |
| Average precipitation inches (mm) | 0.80 (20) | 0.78 (20) | 1.47 (37) | 2.54 (65) | 3.93 (100) | 4.64 (118) | 4.37 (111) | 3.59 (91) | 3.00 (76) | 2.98 (76) | 1.49 (38) | 1.04 (26) | 30.63 (778) |
| Average snowfall inches (cm) | 10.0 (25) | 8.3 (21) | 9.2 (23) | 4.3 (11) | 0.0 (0.0) | 0.0 (0.0) | 0.0 (0.0) | 0.0 (0.0) | 0.0 (0.0) | 0.7 (1.8) | 5.7 (14) | 10.0 (25) | 48.2 (122) |
| Average precipitation days (≥ 0.01 in) | 7.5 | 6.3 | 7.1 | 9.2 | 12.5 | 13.0 | 11.6 | 10.1 | 10.4 | 9.9 | 7.1 | 8.5 | 113.2 |
| Average snowy days (≥ 0.1 in) | 6.1 | 5.0 | 3.5 | 1.7 | 0.0 | 0.0 | 0.0 | 0.0 | 0.0 | 0.6 | 3.2 | 6.7 | 26.8 |
Source: NOAA

=== Superfund site and environmental damage ===
The Burlington Northern (Brainerd/Baxter) United States Environmental Protection Agency Superfund site is on the boundary between Brainerd and Baxter. The site served as a Burlington Northern Railroad tie treatment plant from 1907 to 1985. During that time, wastewater generated from the wood-treating process was sent to two shallow, unlined ponds. This created a toxic sludge that contaminated both the underlying soils and the groundwater with creosote and polynuclear aromatic hydrocarbons (PAHs).

== Demographics ==
Historical population
| Census | Pop. | Note | %± |
|---|---|---|---|
| 1880 | 1,865 | | — |
| 1890 | 5,703 | | 205.8% |
| 1900 | 7,524 | | 31.9% |
| 1910 | 8,526 | | 13.3% |
| 1920 | 9,591 | | 12.5% |
| 1930 | 10,221 | | 6.6% |
| 1940 | 12,071 | | 18.1% |
| 1950 | 12,087 | | 0.1% |
| 1960 | 12,898 | | 6.7% |
| 1970 | 11,667 | | −9.5% |
| 1980 | 11,489 | | −1.5% |
| 1990 | 12,353 | | 7.5% |
| 2000 | 13,178 | | 6.7% |
| 2010 | 13,590 | | 3.1% |
| 2020 | 14,395 | | 5.9% |
| 2022 (est.) | 14,580 | | 1.3% |
U.S. Decennial Census; 2020 Census

=== 2020 census ===
As of the 2020 census, Brainerd had a population of 14,395. The population density was 1,186.7 inhabitants per square mile (458.2/km^{2}). The median age was 35.6 years. 23.7% of residents were under the age of 18 and 17.5% of residents were 65 years of age or older. For every 100 females there were 93.2 males, and for every 100 females age 18 and over there were 89.7 males age 18 and over.

93.9% of residents lived in urban areas, while 6.1% lived in rural areas.

There were 6,086 households in Brainerd, of which 28.4% had children under the age of 18 living in them. Of all households, 28.8% were married-couple households, 23.7% were households with a male householder and no spouse or partner present, and 36.0% were households with a female householder and no spouse or partner present. About 39.3% of all households were made up of individuals and 13.9% had someone living alone who was 65 years of age or older.

There were 6,473 housing units at an average density of 533.6 units per square mile (206.0 units/km^{2}). Of all housing units, 6.0% were vacant. The homeowner vacancy rate was 1.4% and the rental vacancy rate was 5.0%.

Racial composition as of the 2020 census
| Race | Number | Percent |
|---|---|---|
| White | 12,753 | 88.6% |
| Black or African American | 231 | 1.6% |
| American Indian and Alaska Native | 320 | 2.2% |
| Asian | 95 | 0.7% |
| Native Hawaiian and Other Pacific Islander | 3 | 0.0% |
| Some other race | 116 | 0.8% |
| Two or more races | 877 | 6.1% |
| Hispanic or Latino (of any race) | 363 | 2.5% |

=== 2010 census ===
As of the census of 2010, there were 13,590 people, 5,851 households, and 3,069 families living in the city. The population density was 1,141.1 inhabitants per square mile (440.6/km^{2}). There were 6,390 housing units at an average density of 536.5 units per square mile (207.1 units/km^{2}). The racial makeup of the city was 93.5% White, 1.2% African American, 1.6% Native American, 0.3% Asian, 0.4% from other races, and 3.0% from two or more races. Hispanic or Latino of any race were 1.8% of the population.

There were 5,851 households, of which 30.2% had children under the age of 18 living with them, 31.7% were married couples living together, 15.6% had a female householder with no husband present, 5.2% had a male householder with no wife present, and 47.5% were non-families. 37.8% of all households were made up of individuals, and 14.2% had someone living alone who was 65 years of age or older. The average household size was 2.23 and the average family size was 2.92.

The median age in the city was 32.2 years. 24.5% of residents were under the age of 18; 12.5% were between the ages of 18 and 24; 27.5% were from 25 to 44; 20.5% were from 45 to 64, and 15.1% were 65 years of age or older. The gender makeup of the city was 47.6% male and 52.4% female.

=== 2000 census ===
As of the census of 2000, there were 13,178 people, 5,623 households and 3,036 families living in the city. The population density was 1,652.8 inhabitants per square mile (638.1/km^{2}). There were 5,847 housing units at an average density of 733.3 units per square mile (283.1 units/km^{2}). The racial makeup of the city was 95.83% White, 0.71% African American, 1.44% Native American, 0.46% Asian, 0.01% Pacific Islander, 0.26% from other races, and 1.29% from two or more races. Hispanic or Latino of any race were 0.86% of the population. 31.4% were of German, 28.1% Finnish, 17.7% Norwegian, 7.1% Swedish, 6.8% Irish, and 6.1% of United States or American ancestry.

There were 5,623 households, of which 29.4% had children under the age of 18 living with them, 35.8% were married couples living together, 14.3% had a female householder with no husband present, and 46.0% were non-families. 37.5% of all households were made up of individuals, and 16.8% had someone living alone who was 65 years of age or older. The average household size was 2.23 and the average family size was 2.94.

Age distribution was 25.1% under the age of 18, 13.7% from 18 to 24, 26.3% from 25 to 44, 16.8% from 45 to 64, and 18.1% who were 65 years of age or older. The median age was 33. For every 100 females, there were 85.1 males. For every 100 females age 18 and over, there were 79.4 males.

The median household income was $26,901, and the median family income was $35,212. Males had a median income of $27,677 versus $21,217 for females. The per capita income for the city was $15,744. About 11.8% of families and 17.6% of the population were below the poverty line, including 20.5% of those under age 18 and 16.0% of those age 65 or over.

== Arts and culture ==
The Brainerd Lakes Area has a classical music festival during the summers called the Lakes Area Music Festival. According to its website, the festival's mission is to connect the nation's best performers and audiences through excellent classical music and inspiring education. There are educational programs for children in the area with musicians from across the world and high-caliber concerts that are free to the public. The Lakes Area Music Festival, through its Outreach initiative, brings classical music into areas that normally do not get concerts. Among these are public libraries, women's shelters, retirement homes, and correctional facilities. The program is supported by many local and national organizations, as well as people in the community.

== Education ==
Brainerd Public Schools is the local school district. Brainerd High School is the local high school; the district also hosts an alternative high school, and online classes.

Alternative schools in Brainerd include Discovery Woods Charter School (K-6) and St Francis Catholic School (K-8, run by the Roman Catholic Diocese of Duluth).

Central Lakes College is a local community and technical college offering associates degrees and technical certificates. It is part of the Minnesota State Colleges system.

== Media ==
Radio stations and television channels in the Brainerd Lakes area:

=== Radio ===
AM radio stations
| Frequency | Call sign | Name | Format | Owner |
|---|---|---|---|---|
| 1270 | WWWI | Talk 100 | News/Talk | R & J Broadcasting, Inc. |
| 1340 | KVBR | Brainerd Business Radio | News/Talk | Hubbard Broadcasting |
| 1380 | KLIZ | 1380 The Fan | Sports | Hubbard Broadcasting |

FM radio stations
| Frequency | Call sign | Name | Format | Owner |
|---|---|---|---|---|
| 88.3 | KBPN | MPR News | NPR | Minnesota Public Radio |
| 88.7 | K204ES (KAWZ Translator) | CSN International | Christian | CSN International |
| 89.3 | KOPJ | LifeTalk Radio | Christian | Seventh-day Adventist Church |
| 89.9 | K210DR (KAXE Translator) | Northern Community Radio | Public radio | Northern Community Radio |
| 90.7 | KBPR | Classical MPR | Classical | Minnesota Public Radio |
| 93.3 | KBLB | B93.3 | Country | Hubbard Broadcasting |
| 95.9 | WWWI | Cash 95.9 | Country/Adult Standard | R & J Broadcasting, Inc. |
| 96.3 | W242DB (WWWI-AM Translator) | Talk 100 | News/Talk | R & J Broadcasting, Inc. |
| 100.1 | KLKS | Talk 100 | News/Talk | R & J Broadcasting, Inc. |
| 101.5 | KFGI | Skeeter 101-5 | Adult Hits | R & J Broadcasting, Inc. |
| 102.7 | KTIG | The Word | Christian | Minnesota Christian Broadcasters |
| 103.5 | KUAL| Cool 103.5 |The Lakes Greatest Hits | Oldies/Classic Hits | Hubbard Broadcasting | |
| 104.3 | WZFJ | The Pulse | Christian | Minnesota Christian Broadcasters |
| 106.7 | WJJY | Today's Best Variety | Adult contemporary | Hubbard Broadcasting |
| 107.5 | KLIZ | The Power Loon | Classic rock | Hubbard Broadcasting |

=== Television ===
| Channel | Callsign | Affiliation | Branding | Subchannels | | Owner |
| (Virtual) | Callsign | Affiliation | Branding | Channel | Programming | Owner |
|---|---|---|---|---|---|---|
| 16.1 | K16BQ (KSAX Translator) | ABC | 5 Eyewitness News | 16.2; 16.3 | 45TV; MeTV | Hubbard Broadcasting |
| 26.1 | K20NH-D (KMSP Translator) | FOX | FOX 9 | 26.2; 26.3 | FOX9+ Movies! | Fox Television Stations, Inc. |
| 22.1 | KAWB | PBS | Lakeland PBS | 22.2; 22.3; 22.4; 22.5; 22.6 | First Nations Experience; PBS Kids; Create; PBS Encore; Minnesota Channel | Northern Minnesota Public Television, Inc. |

== Infrastructure ==
=== Major highways ===
The following routes are in the Brainerd area:

- Minnesota State Highway 18
- Minnesota State Highway 25
- Minnesota State Highway 210
- Minnesota State Highway 371

=== Airport ===
Brainerd Lakes Regional Airport serves the area with commercial airline service on Delta Connection and three cargo airlines.

== Notable people ==
- Solomon Flagg Alderman (1861–1928), Minnesota state senator and lawyer
- John Carlton Atherton (1900–1952), artist
- Roger Awsumb (1928–2002), TV and radio show host
- Win Borden (1943–2014), Minnesota state senator
- Marvin W. Bursch, state legislator and businessman; worked in Brainerd briefly
- Bullet Joe Bush (1892–1974), member of the New York Yankees' first World Series championship team in 1923
- Franklin E. Ebner, Minnesota state senator and lawyer
- Ronald Everson (1930-2024), member of the Minnesota House of Representatives in the 1960s
- Joe Haeg (born 1993), professional football player
- Johnny Holm, singer
- Frank B. Johnson (1894–1949), mayor of Brainerd and Minnesota state representative
- Brock Larson (born 1977), MMA fighter
- Charles Marohn (born 1973), author and founder of Strong Towns
- Rick Nolan (1943-2024), U.S. Representative
- Todd Revenig, professional baseball player
- Hilding Alfred Swanson (1885–1964), Minnesota state legislator and lawyer
- Dale Walz (1964–2024), Minnesota state representative and police officer

== In popular culture ==
The 1996 film Fargo was set partly in Brainerd.

== See also ==
- Burlington Northern (Brainerd/Baxter)
- List of Superfund sites in Minnesota
