= Breezy Point, Minnesota =

City in Minnesota, United States

Breezy Point
- City
- Location of Breezy Point within Crow Wing County, Minnesota
- Coordinates: 46°36′29″N 94°13′05″W
- Country: United States
- State: Minnesota
- County: Crow Wing

Area
  - Total: 12.85 sq mi (33.28 km^{2})
  - Land: 11.73 sq mi (30.37 km^{2})
  - Water: 1.13 sq mi (2.92 km^{2})
- Elevation: 1,211 ft (369 m)

Population (2020)
  - Total: 2,574
  - Density: 219.5/sq mi (84.76/km^{2})
- Time zone: UTC-6 (Central (CST))
  - Summer (DST): UTC-5 (CDT)
- ZIP code: 56472
- Area code: 218
- FIPS code: 27-07516
- GNIS feature ID: 2393410
- Website: www.breezypointmn.gov

Breezy Point is a city in Crow Wing County, Minnesota, United States. It is part of the Brainerd Micropolitan Statistical Area. The population was 2,574 at the 2020 census.

== History ==
The city of Breezy Point is best known for being the home to a resort of the same name on land acquired in 1921 by millionaire publicist Wilford Fawcett, owner of Fawcett Publications, and creator of the famous Whiz Bang magazine. His personal home, Fawcett House, is on rental to the public.

With the resort community growing as a result of Fawcett's actions, a village was incorporated in 1939 with the name of Pelican Lakes. It was renamed to Breezy Point in 1969.

== Geography ==
According to the United States Census Bureau, the city has a total area of 16.56 square miles (42.89 km^{2}), of which 13.20 square miles (34.19 km^{2}) is land and 3.36 square miles (8.70 km^{2}) is water. Main routes include County Roads 4, 11, and 39.

Breezy Point is part of the Brainerd Lakes Area. It is along Pelican Lake.

== Demographics ==
Historical population
Census	Pop.	Note	%±
1940	114		—
1950	154		35.1%
1960	134		−13.0%
1970	233		73.9%
1980	384		64.8%
1990	432		12.5%
2000	979		126.6%
2010	2,346		139.6%
2020	2,574		9.7%
U.S. Decennial Census

=== 2020 census ===
As of the 2020 census, Breezy Point had a population of 2,574. The median age was 44.4 years. 22.9% of residents were under the age of 18 and 22.6% of residents were 65 years of age or older. For every 100 females there were 101.1 males, and for every 100 females age 18 and over there were 100.3 males age 18 and over.

0.0% of residents lived in urban areas, while 100.0% lived in rural areas.

There were 1,026 households in Breezy Point, of which 28.8% had children under the age of 18 living in them. Of all households, 63.4% were married-couple households, 13.5% were households with a male householder and no spouse or partner present, and 15.4% were households with a female householder and no spouse or partner present. About 20.7% of all households were made up of individuals and 9.0% had someone living alone who was 65 years of age or older.

There were 1,738 housing units, of which 41.0% were vacant. The homeowner vacancy rate was 2.0% and the rental vacancy rate was 2.4%.

Racial composition as of the 2020 census
Race	Number	Percent
White	2,465	95.8%
Black or African American	5	0.2%
American Indian and Alaska Native	13	0.5%
Asian	7	0.3%
Native Hawaiian and Other Pacific Islander	0	0.0%
Some other race	11	0.4%
Two or more races	73	2.8%
Hispanic or Latino (of any race)	18	0.7%

=== 2010 census ===
As of the census of 2010, there were 2,346 people, 904 households, and 681 families living in the city. The population density was 177.7 inhabitants per square mile (68.6/km^{2}). There were 1,797 housing units at an average density of 136.1 per square mile (52.5/km^{2}). The racial makeup of the city was 98.7% White, 0.3% African American, 0.3% Native American, 0.2% Asian, 0.1% from other races, and 0.6% from two or more races. Hispanic or Latino of any race were 0.3% of the population.

There were 904 households, of which 37.2% had children under the age of 18 living with them, 65.5% were married couples living together, 6.2% had a female householder with no spouse present, 3.7% had a male householder with no spouse present, and 24.7% were non-families. 19.9% of all households were made up of individuals, and 5.7% had someone living alone who was 65 years of age or older. The average household size was 2.60 and the average family size was 2.97.

The median age in the city was 38.4 years. 27.9% of residents were under the age of 18; 4.2% were between the ages of 18 and 24; 28.4% were from 25 to 44; 26.1% were from 45 to 64; and 13.5% were 65 years of age or older. The gender makeup of the city was 50.7% male and 49.3% female.

=== 2000 census ===
As of the census of 2000, there were 979 people, 413 households, and 306 families living in the city. The population density was 74.7 inhabitants per square mile (28.8/km^{2}). There were 899 housing units at an average density of 68.6 per square mile (26.5/km^{2}). The racial makeup of the city was 98.16% White, 0.20% African American, 0.31% Native American, 0.10% Asian, 0.20% from other races, and 1.02% from two or more races. Hispanic or Latino of any race were 0.31% of the population. 35.7% were of German, 16.2% Norwegian, 8.3% Swedish, 6.7% Polish, 6.6% Irish and 5.2% English ancestry according to Census 2000.

There were 413 households, out of which 28.1% had children under the age of 18 living with them, 66.3% were married couples living together, 4.8% had a female householder with no husband present, and 25.7% were non-families. 19.9% of all households were made up of individuals, and 5.8% had someone living alone who was 65 years of age or older. The average household size was 2.37 and the average family size was 2.69.

In the city, the population was spread out, with 21.9% under the age of 18, 5.3% from 18 to 24, 24.2% from 25 to 44, 29.2% from 45 to 64, and 19.4% who were 65 years of age or older. The median age was 43 years. For every 100 females, there were 95.8 males. For every 100 females age 18 and over, there were 102.4 males.

The median income for a household in the city was $84,000, and the median income for a family was $99,063. Males had a median income of $88,125 versus $51,397 for females. The per capita income for the city was $81,959. About 0.9% of families and 2.2% of the population were below the poverty line, including 2.9% of those under age 18 and 2.9% of those age 65 or over.

== Education ==
Pequot Lakes Public Schools is the public school district. Pequot Lakes High School is the district's high school.
