= Rod Trongard =

American sports broadcaster (1933–2005)

Rod Trongard in 2003

Rodney Douglas Trongard (February 16, 1933 – July 16, 2005) was a Minnesota-based sports broadcaster on both radio and television in the Minneapolis-St. Paul area for more than fifty years.

== Early career ==
Trongard's career began in 1953 at KXRA Alexandria, followed by positions at KSDN Aberdeen, South Dakota, and KDIO Ortonville. He moved to the Twin Cities in 1959 as news director at WLOL. It was there than Trongard began his sports broadcasting career, calling basketball for the Minnesota Muskies as well as the Minneapolis Lakers (preceding Chick Hearn until the Lakers moved to Los Angeles). Trongard also called University of Minnesota football and basketball.

He joined KSTP in 1968, where he broadcast Minnesota Pipers basketball, produced Minnesota Vikings football and Minnesota North Stars hockey broadcasts, and did player and coach interviews. He also hosted Minnesota Gopher football coach Cal Stoll's show on KSTP TV. He also was the public address announcer for the Minnesota Fighting Saints (WHA) hockey team and the Minnesota Kicks (NASL) soccer team.

== Wrestling ==
Trongard was a commentator for the American Wrestling Association (AWA) professional wrestling promotion throughout the 1980s, calling matches involving the likes of Hulk Hogan, Nick Bockwinkel, Bobby Heenan, Verne Gagne, The Road Warriors, Shawn Michaels and many others. Trongard's voice was featured on the AWA's weekly ESPN broadcasts, reaching millions of homes around the world. His signature phrase was "From coast to coast, continent to continent, and border to border". During broadcasts, he often included city names in the phrase, signifying the broad reach of wrestling and the AWA's broadcasts at the time. Trongard called matches alongside fellow commentators Lord James Blears and Lee Marshall.

Trongard left the AWA in 1988 for a brief stint in the World Wrestling Federation (WWF), before retiring from the wrestling scene in early 1989. While in the WWF, he performed commentary alongside Superstar Billy Graham, Lord Alfred Hayes, Hillbilly Jim and Sean Mooney.

As a wrestling announcer, Trongard generally favoured the fan favourite wrestlers.

== Later career and death ==
Trongard joined KEEZ FM Mankato in 1982, where he did morning drive, news, and sports for eleven years before moving to KTOE/KDOG Mankato in 1993. He continued to broadcast sports on KTOE/KDOG and on KXAC/KRRW St. James for many years, and was an important part of the community in southern Minnesota until he died after a long battle with liver cancer in June 2005. He was also the stadium voice of the Minnesota Kicks and Minnesota Strikers at Metropolitan Stadium and The Met Sports Center

Trongard was inducted into the Pavek Museum of Broadcasting Hall of Fame in 2003.
