= KNSG =

KNSG may refer to:

- KNSG (FM), a radio station (107.5 FM) licensed to serve Marshall, Minnesota, United States
- KARZ (FM), a radio station (94.7 FM) licensed to serve Springfield, Minnesota, which held the call sign KNSG from 1995 to 2017
