= KOWZ =

KOWZ may refer to:

- KOWZ (FM), a radio station (100.9 FM) licensed to serve Blooming Prairie, Minnesota, United States
- KFOW, a radio station (1170 AM) licensed to serve Waseca, Minnesota, which held the call sign KOWZ from 2003 to 2012 and 2015 to 2020
