= KYSM =

KYSM may refer to:

- Kolej Yayasan Saad, a private residential secondary school in Malacca, Malaysia
- KYSM-FM, a radio station (103.5 FM) licensed to Mankato, Minnesota, United States
- KFSP, a radio station (1230 AM) licensed to Mankato, Minnesota, which held the call sign KSYM from the 1930s to 2014
