= KRRW (FM) =

Radio station in Winthrop–New Ulm, Minnesota

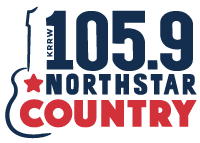
- Winthrop, Minnesota; United States
- Broadcast area: New Ulm, Minnesota
- Frequency: 105.9 MHz
- Branding: North Star Country 105.9

Programming
- Format: Classic country
- Affiliations: Real Country

Ownership
- Owner: Linder Radio Group; (Subarctic Media, LLC)
- Sister stations: KATO-FM, KDOG, KFSP, KTOE, KXAC, KXLP

History
- First air date: 2008 (as KHRS)
- Former call signs: KHRS (2007–2020)
- Call sign meaning: Sounds like the word "Crow"

Technical information
- Licensing authority: FCC
- Facility ID: 165993
- Class: C3
- ERP: 23,000 watts
- HAAT: 105 metres (344 ft)

Links
- Public license information: Public file; LMS
- Webcast: Listen Live
- Website: krrw.com

KRRW (105.9 FM; "North Star Country 105.9") is a radio station broadcasting a classic country format in New Ulm, Minnesota (licensed to Winthrop). The station serves the New Ulm area, as well as the Mankato metropolitan area with a fringe signal. KRRW is owned by Linder Radio Group.

== History ==
KRRW signed on the air in 2008 as KHRS, simulcasting Mankato sister station KXLP (94.1 FM). KHRS brought KXLP's programming back to the New Ulm area, which the 94.1 signal did not reach; until 2007, the format and call sign was used on 93.1 FM in New Ulm (now KATO-FM). The KXLP simulcast ended in April 2020, when KHRS began to simulcast classic country with KEMJ (101.5 FM); the station took on 101.5's former KRRW call sign and branded as "North Star Country 105.9". KEMJ broke away from the simulcast in May 2020 and began stunting, ultimately changing to a hot adult contemporary format on May 18; the classic country format remained on 105.9.
