= KNUJ =

KNUJ may refer to:

- KNUJ (AM), a radio station (860 AM) licensed to New Ulm, Minnesota, United States
- KNUJ-FM, a radio station (107.3 FM) licensed to Sleepy Eye, Minnesota, United States
