= KRRW =

KRRW may refer to:

- KRRW (FM), a radio station (105.9 FM) licensed to serve Winthrop, Minnesota, United States
- KEMJ, a radio station (101.5 FM) licensed to serve St. James, Minnesota, which held the call sign KRRW from 1997 to 2020
- KBFB, a radio station (97.9 FM) licensed to serve Dallas, Texas, United States, which held the call sign KLLI from 1993 to 1997
