= KMKO =

KMKO may refer to:

- KMKO-FM, a radio station (95.7 FM) licensed to serve Lake Crystal, Minnesota, United States
- Davis Field (Oklahoma), a general aviation airport near Muskogee, Oklahoma, assigned ICAO code KMKO
