= KNUJ-FM =

Coordinates: 44.327°N 94.728°W

- Sleepy Eye, Minnesota; United States
- Broadcast area: New Ulm, Minnesota
- Frequency: 107.3 MHz
- Branding: SAM 107.3

Programming
- Format: Classic hits
- Affiliations: Minnesota Vikings

Ownership
- Owner: James Ingstad
- Sister stations: KNUJ

History
- First air date: June 1995
- Call sign meaning: K New Ulm Journal

Technical information
- Licensing authority: FCC
- Facility ID: 77674
- Class: A
- ERP: 4,000 watts
- HAAT: 124 meters

Links
- Public license information: Public file; LMS
- Webcast: Listen Live
- Website: KNUJ-FM Online

KNUJ-FM (107.3 MHz) is a radio station in Sleepy Eye, Minnesota. The station airs a classic hits format, as "SAM 107.3", and is owned by James Ingstad. KNUJ also has an AM sister station, KNUJ 860 AM.

== History ==
- See also KNUJ

The KNUJ-FM call letters were originally on 93.1 FM.

KNUJ-FM signed on in June 1995, as "BRaT 107.3." The 4,000-watt station licensed to nearby Sleepy Eye played adult contemporary music. Both stations simulcast from 6–8:30 am, Monday through Friday, and shorter hours on Saturday. A month later, KNSG in Springfield, Minnesota signed on the air.

On August 14, 1998, Cumulus Broadcasting purchased many stations from Ingstad. Two years later, Cumulus turned around and sold some of the stations, including KNUJ and KNUJ-FM to Clear Channel. The sale became effective on October 2, 2000.

Ingstad obtained the three stations again from Clear Channel in February 2003, as part of a trade for a station in Bismarck, North Dakota. KNSG was spun off to Linder Radio.

KNUJ-FM changed its format to adult hits in June 2005, picking up a satellite-fed syndicated format from Westwood One, and becoming "SAM 107.3." After the shutdown of the Sam FM network, KNUJ shifted to classic hits during the Labor Day weekend of 2015.

== Programming ==
Both KNUJ and KNUJ-FM simulcast a common morning show weekdays. KNUJ-FM also broadcasts a live local news show from Sleepy Eye following the show.
