= KDOG =

Radio station in North Mankato–Mankato, Minnesota

Coordinates: 44.222°N 94.118°W

- North Mankato, Minnesota; United States
- Broadcast area: Mankato, Minnesota
- Frequency: 96.7 MHz
- Branding: Hot 96.7

Programming
- Format: Top 40 (CHR)

Ownership
- Owner: Linder Radio Group; (Subarctic Media, LLC)
- Sister stations: KTOE, KATO-FM, KEMJ, KXLP, KXAC, KFSP, KRRW

History
- First air date: April 1, 1985; 40 years ago
- Call sign meaning: Kickin' The DOG FM (former branding)

Technical information
- Licensing authority: FCC
- Facility ID: 42993
- Class: C3
- ERP: 4,000 watts
- HAAT: 198 m (650 ft)

Links
- Public license information: Public file; LMS
- Webcast: Listen Live
- Website: hot967.fm

KDOG (96.7 FM, "Hot 96.7") is a radio station serving Mankato, Minnesota. The station airs a Top 40 (CHR) format. They are licensed to North Mankato, Minnesota and serves the Mankato area and the Minnesota River Valley. KDOG is owned by Linder Radio Group.

== History ==
The station went on the air at 12:01 a.m. on April 1, 1985, as "All Hit 97 KDOG". The very first song played was "FM (No Static at All)" by Steely Dan. Original on-air staff included: Rick Williams (Morning Drive), Brian Garvin (Middays), John McCormick (Afternoon Drive), Dr. Bob (Evenings), Randy Paul (Overnights), Johnny Martin (Weekends), Dave Sterling (Weekends). At the time, KDOG was the only CHR format in the Mankato area. About 4 months later, KEEZ changed to "Z99" and adopted the CHR format as well. Over the years, KDOG has tweaked its on-air presentation slightly, going so far as to rebrand itself as "The Spot @ 96-7" in May 1999, with a modern AC orientation and the syndicated Bob and Sheri morning show. The station dropped the "Spot" moniker and transitioned to a broader hot adult contemporary format in August 2002, and flipped to adult hits in 2006. From April 2006 to July 2008, KDOG simulcasted on sister station KNSG in Springfield, Minnesota, which serves Redwood Falls and Marshall. On September 4, 2009, KDOG returned to its CHR roots as "Hot 96.7".
