= Owatonna, Minnesota =

City in Minnesota, United States

Owatonna
- City
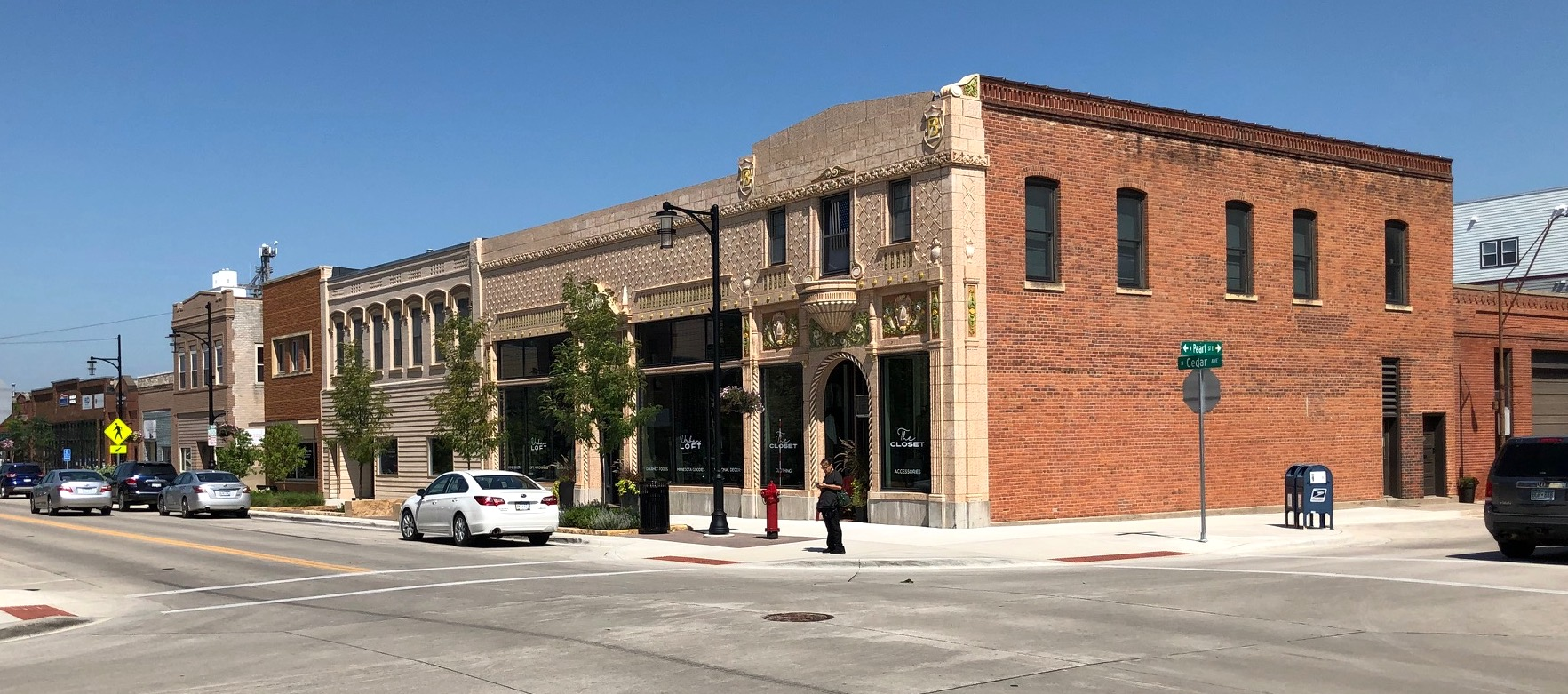
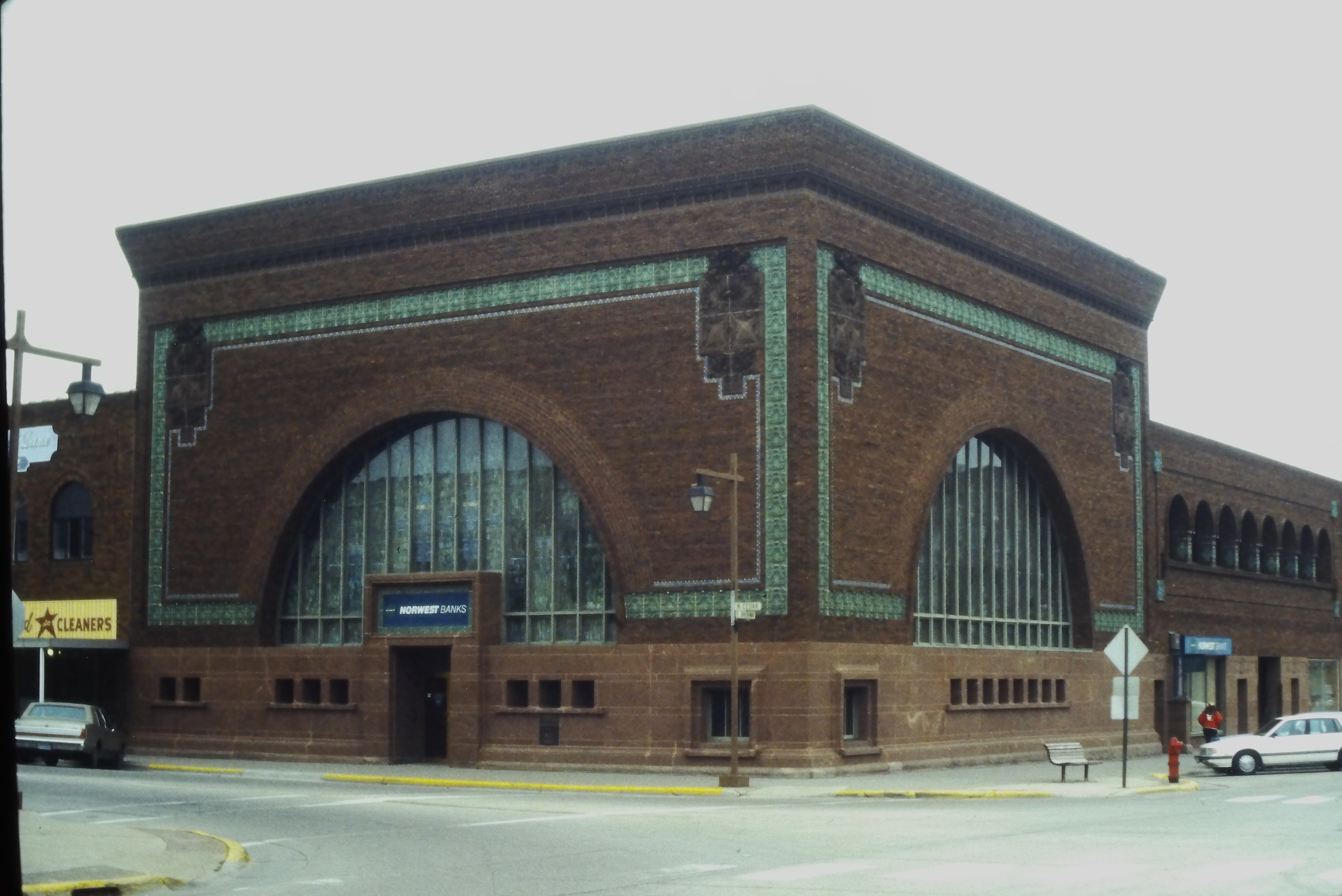
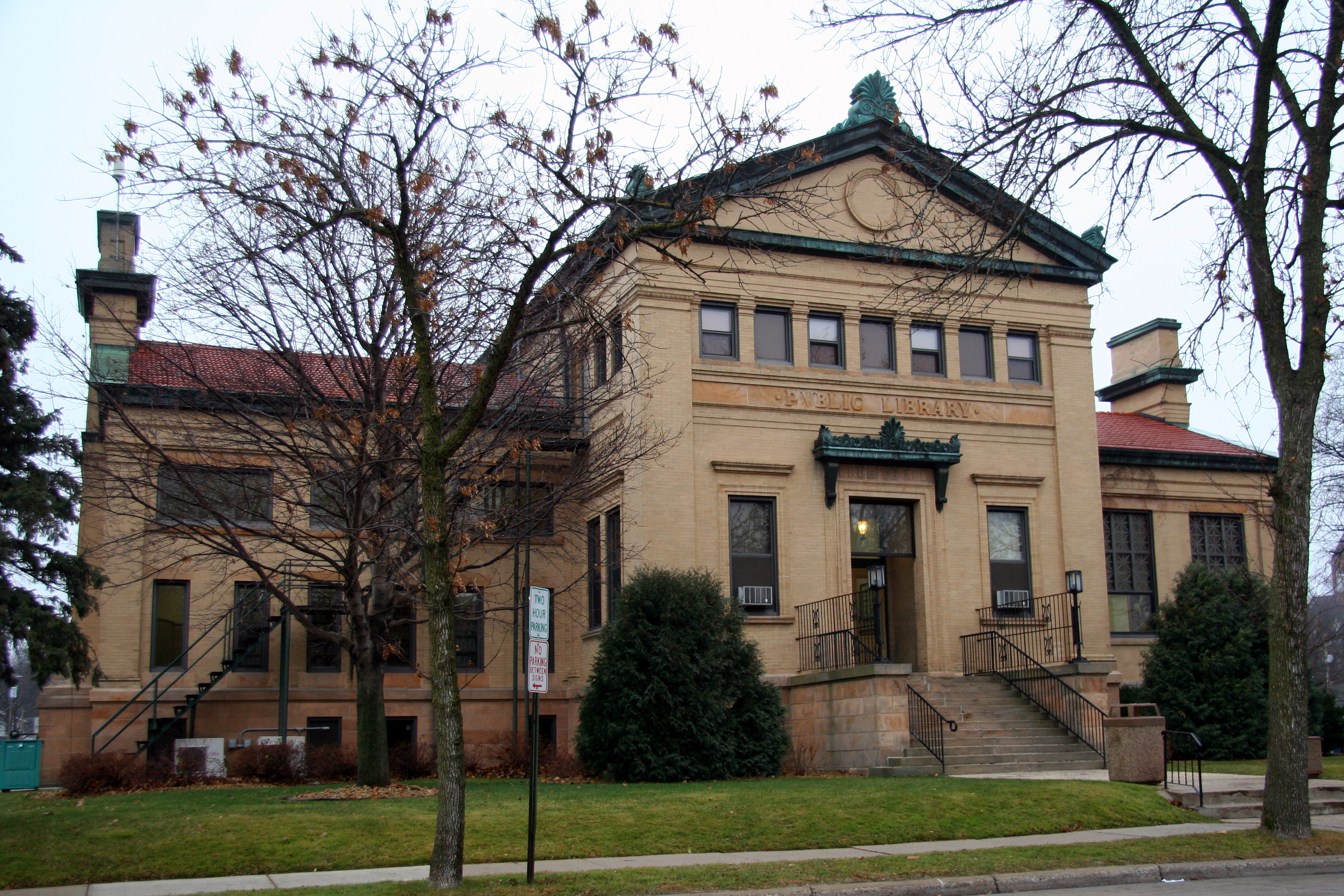
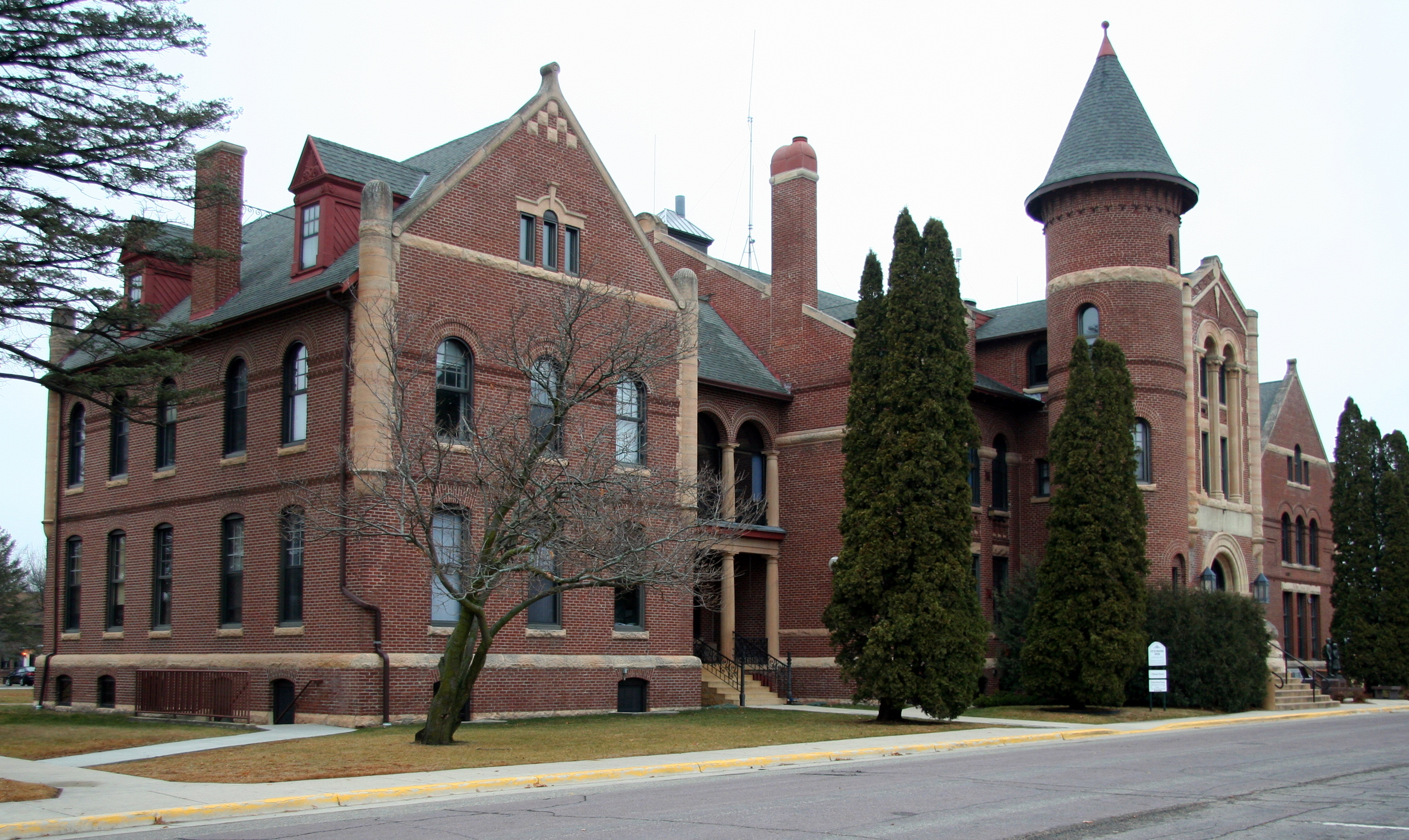
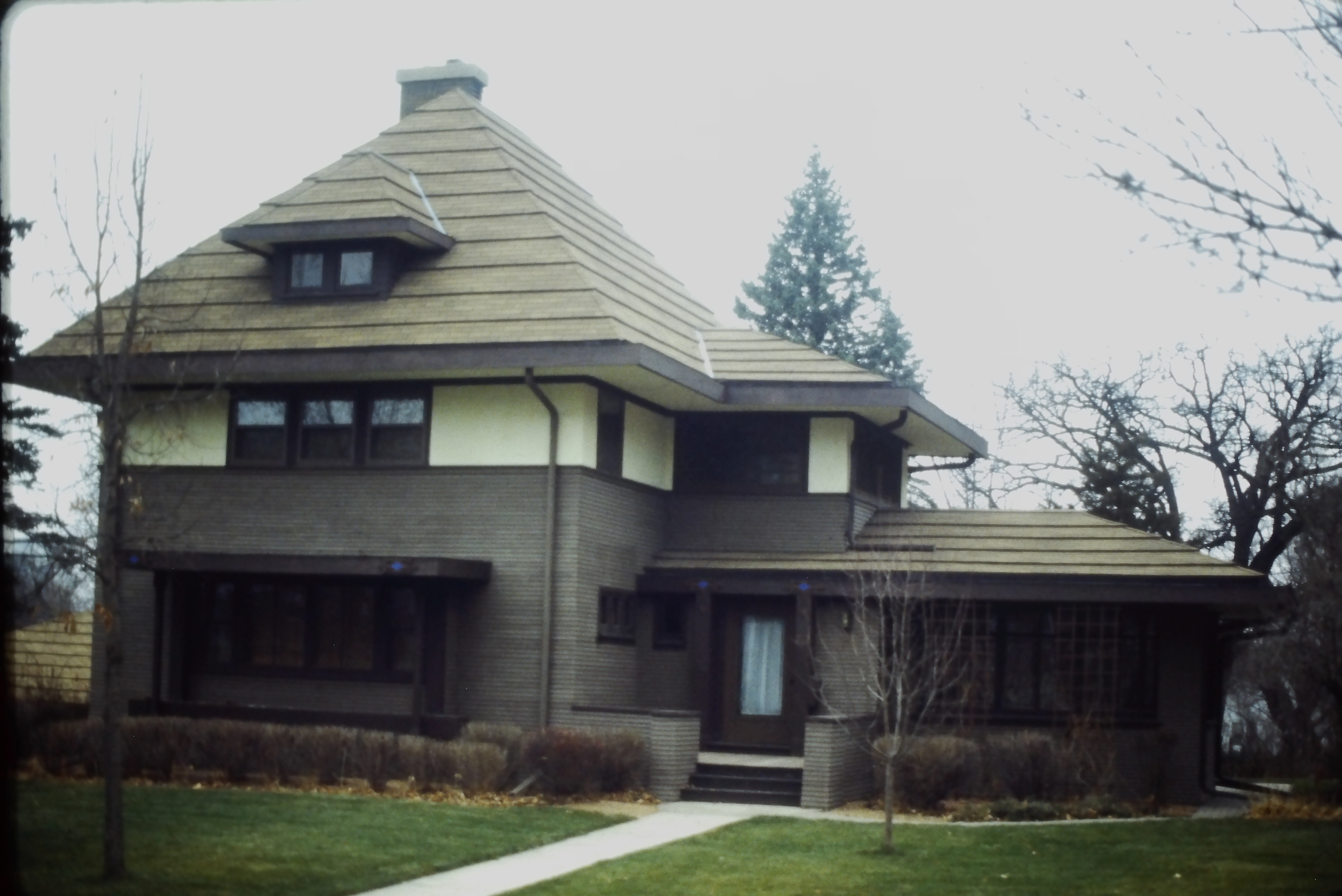
- Owatonna Commercial Historic District National Farmers' Bank Owatonna Public Library State Public School Orphanage Museum Dr. John H. Adair House

- Logo
- Nickname: O-Town
- Location of Owatonna within Steele County and state of Minnesota
- Coordinates: 44°05′28″N 93°13′52″W
- Country: United States
- State: Minnesota
- County: Steele
- Settled: 1854
- Platted: September 1855
- Incorporated (town): August 9, 1858
- Incorporated (city): February 23, 1865
- Named for: Straight River

Government
  - Type: Representative council
  - Mayor: Matt Jessop

Area
  - Total: 15.20 sq mi (39.36 km^{2})
  - Land: 15.11 sq mi (39.14 km^{2})
  - Water: 0.085 sq mi (0.22 km^{2})
- Elevation: 1,132 ft (345 m)

Population (2020)
  - Total: 26,420
  - Estimate (2022): 26,470
  - Density: 1,748.2/sq mi (674.98/km^{2})
- Time zone: UTC-6 (Central)
  - Summer (DST): UTC-5 (CDT)
- ZIP code: 55060
- Area code: 507
- FIPS code: 27-49300
- GNIS feature ID: 2396114
- Website: owatonna.gov

Owatonna (/ˌoʊwəˈtɒnə/) is a city in and the county seat of Steele County, Minnesota, United States. The population was 26,420 at the 2020 census. Owatonna is home to the Steele County Fairgrounds, which hosts the Steele County Free Fair in August. Interstate 35 and U.S. Highways 14 and 218 are three of the main routes in the city.

== History ==
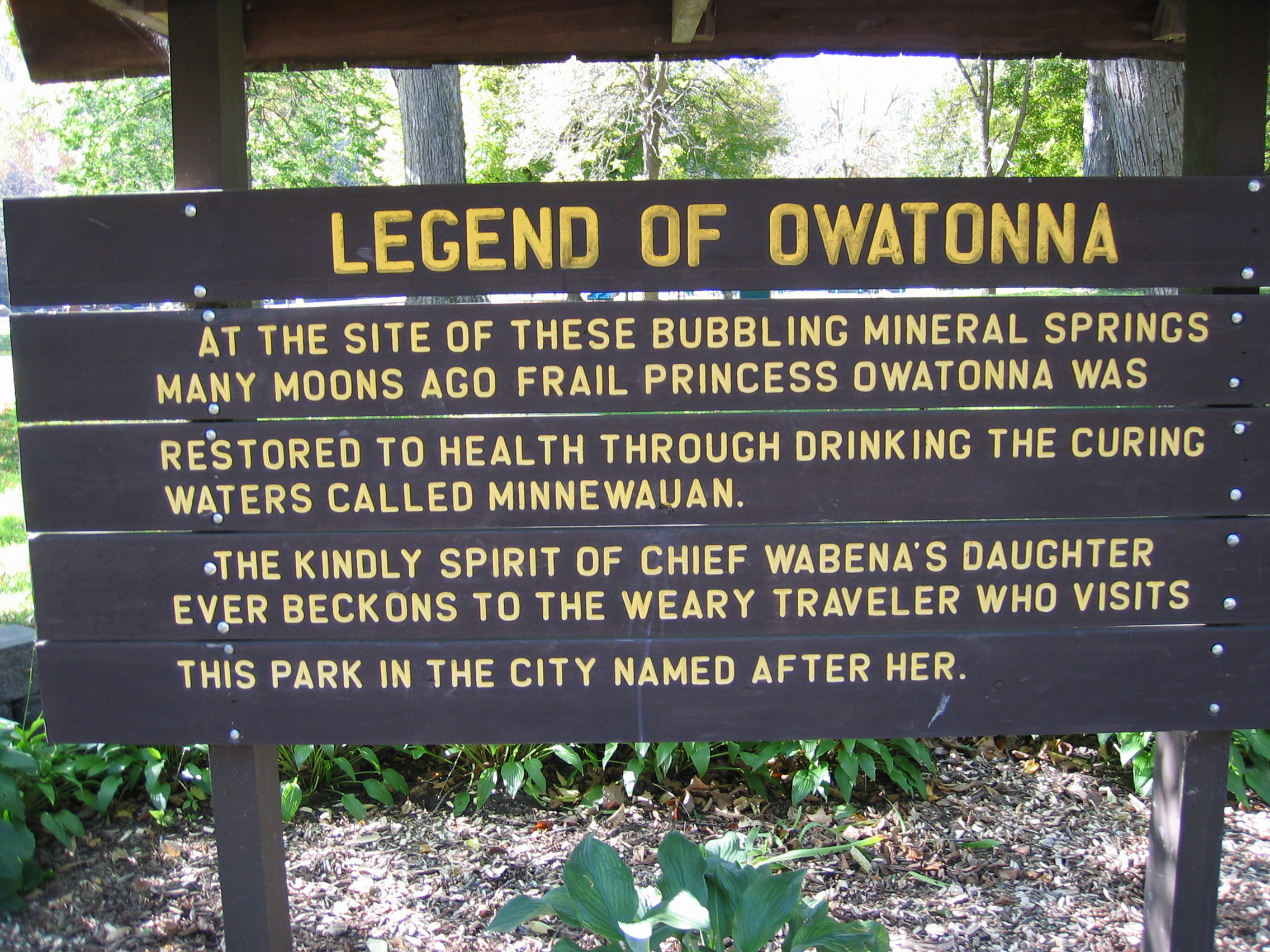
Mineral Springs Park, Owatonna, MN

Whites settled in the Owatonna area in 1853 around the Straight River. Most of the white settlers were Yankees from New England and Upstate New York. The community was named after the Straight River, which in the Dakota language is Wakpá Owóthaŋna. A popular, but apocryphal, story is that the town is named after "Princess Owatonna", the daughter of local Native American Chief Wabena who was supposedly healed by a nearby spring's magic waters, which were said to be rich in iron and sulfur. The earliest the Owatonna area was settled was in 1854. It was platted in September 1855, incorporated as a town on August 9, 1858, and as a city on February 23, 1865.

In 1856, Josef Karel Kaplan emigrated from the village of Dlouhá Třebová, southeast of Prague, Bohemia (now the Czech Republic), and selected a quarter section [160 acres (65 ha)] of land near the town of Owatonna. Kaplan described Owatonna as having just 50 small homes, but predicted 100 within a year, along with a railroad. With just four stores and a pharmacy, Owatonna quickly prospered and grew to 1,500 inhabitants in five years. Kaplan wrote about the Owatonna area in letters donated to the Minnesota Historical Society. In them, he described often seeing the indigenous people with "tough constitutions...brown skin and good dispositions", adding: "When you read about battles between whites and Indians, it is the whites who are to blame." In 1866, Kaplan helped organize the Catholic cemetery, and a year later, the Bohemian National Cemetery of Owatonna.

Kaplan's Woods is part of the land originally owned by Josef Kaplan, and later Victor and Anna Kaplan. The State of Minnesota created Kaplan's Wood State Park, which was later transferred to the City of Owatonna. The Kaplan's Woods Parkway contains over 6 miles (10 km) of hiking and cross country skiing trails, and nearly 2 miles (3 km) of hard-surfaced, handicapped-accessible trail. The parkway includes Lake Kohlmier, a 35-acre (14 ha) lake.

The Minnesota State Public School for Dependent and Neglected Children was built in 1886. The school took in orphans from around the state and taught them "the value of drill, discipline, and labor." The children who died in the institution were interred in the Children's Cemetery behind the school. In 1945, the orphanage closed and in 1947 the State Public School was officially abolished and all its lands, buildings, property, and funds were transferred to the newly established Owatonna State School, which provided academic and vocational training for the developmentally disabled. The Owatonna State School was closed June 30, 1970. In 1974, the City purchased the compound for its office space. Renamed "West Hills," it continues to serve as the city's administration complex and home to many nonprofit civic organizations including a senior activity center, the Owatonna Arts Center, two nonprofit daycare centers, a chemical dependency halfway house, and Big Brothers/Big Sisters, among others.

In July 2008, a Raytheon Hawker 800 corporate jet crashed near Owatonna, resulting in eight deaths.

On November 3, 2015, the Owatonna Public School District passed a bond referendum to fund school facilities improvements focusing on deferred maintenance, safety, and Elementary school crowding. As a result, the school district received $77.9 million to repair all buildings, replace out-of-date equipment, update security in all seven public school buildings, switch the use for two school buildings, and reconfigure grades from K-5, 6, 7–8, 9–12 to K-5, 6–8, 9–12. All facility changes and projects were completed by September 2018.

On November 5, 2019, Owatonna voters approved a referendum, allowing the school district 104 million dollars in bond authority to build a new Owatonna High School. A smaller bond was also approved for the redevelopment of the old OHS site. The new high school, a 317,000 square foot building, located in south eastern Owatonna, broke ground on May 6, 2021, and opened to students on September 5, 2023. A public grand opening ceremony was held on September 23, 2023.

The Steele County Historical Society "preserves Steele County's past, shares the county's stories, and connects people with history in meaningful ways, for today and for tomorrow." Established in 1949 to preserve the history of Steele County, it has become one of the largest and most prestigious historical societies in the state. In 1962, the Society permanently leased part of the southeast section of the fairgrounds to begin a pioneer village, the Village of Yesteryear, which has grown in the years since through the additional move of historic structures, as well as museum buildings built on site.

== Geography ==
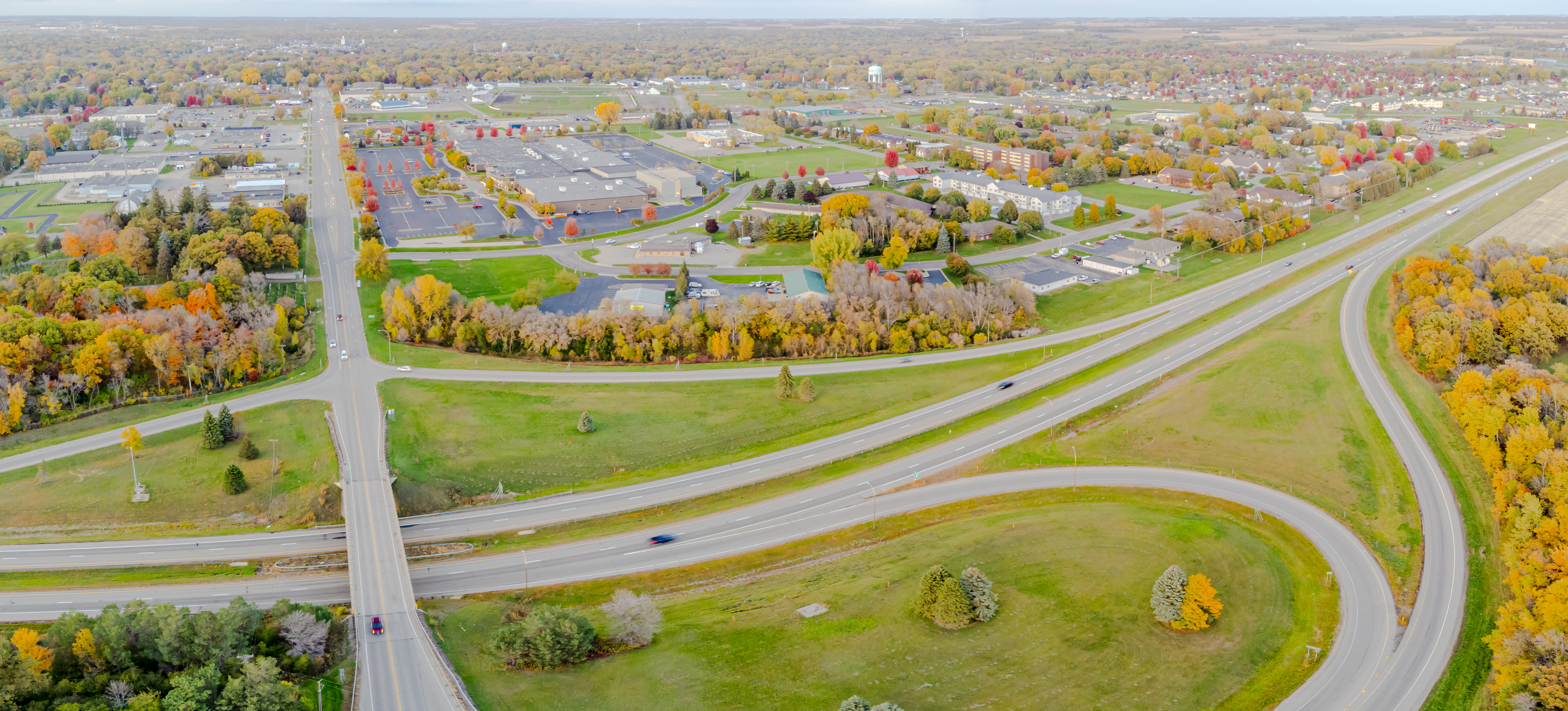
US-14 going through Owatonna

According to the United States Census Bureau, the city has an area of 14.62 square miles (37.87 km^{2}); 14.53 square miles (37.63 km^{2}) is land and 0.09 square miles (0.23 km^{2}) is water. The oldest part of the city (including the downtown area) is on a low-lying area on the eastern bank of the Straight River, extending towards the south from Maple Creek. The city has grown in all directions, and now lies on both sides of the river, as well as above the ridge north of Maple Creek. Significant growth in recent years has occurred to the northeast, where homes have been built along the ravine of Maple Creek as well as alongside Brooktree Golf Course, to the north, and to the southeast. Geographical landmarks of note include Kaplan's Woods, a hardwood nature preserve on the southern border of the city; Cinder Hill, a steep 60-foot hill on Linn Avenue overlooking downtown that local athletes use for training; the Straight River dam, originally used to power a mill and now reconstructed to include a fish ladder; and the Forest Hill Cemetery, an old wooded cemetery on the ridge north of Maple Creek that marks the boundary between the oldest parts of the city and more recent developments.

Record rainfall events from September 22 to 24, 2010, caused flooding of the Straight River and Maple Creek in and near Owatonna, with developments in the floodplains of both streams completely inundated.

=== Climate ===
Climate data for Owatonna, Minnesota, 1991–2020 normals, extremes 1961–present
Month	Jan	Feb	Mar	Apr	May	Jun	Jul	Aug	Sep	Oct	Nov	Dec	Year
Record high °F (°C)	58 (14)	65 (18)	81 (27)	92 (33)	98 (37)	102 (39)	102 (39)	102 (39)	98 (37)	93 (34)	78 (26)	67 (19)	102 (39)
Mean maximum °F (°C)	41.5 (5.3)	46.3 (7.9)	64.0 (17.8)	79.2 (26.2)	88.1 (31.2)	92.5 (33.6)	92.5 (33.6)	90.6 (32.6)	88.1 (31.2)	81.5 (27.5)	63.8 (17.7)	46.8 (8.2)	95.2 (35.1)
Mean daily maximum °F (°C)	22.2 (−5.4)	26.8 (−2.9)	39.6 (4.2)	55.3 (12.9)	67.7 (19.8)	78.3 (25.7)	81.7 (27.6)	79.4 (26.3)	72.8 (22.7)	58.7 (14.8)	41.6 (5.3)	27.9 (−2.3)	54.3 (12.4)
Daily mean °F (°C)	13.7 (−10.2)	18.0 (−7.8)	30.7 (−0.7)	44.8 (7.1)	57.1 (13.9)	68.1 (20.1)	71.8 (22.1)	69.5 (20.8)	62.1 (16.7)	48.3 (9.1)	33.3 (0.7)	20.3 (−6.5)	44.8 (7.1)
Mean daily minimum °F (°C)	5.1 (−14.9)	9.2 (−12.7)	21.8 (−5.7)	34.2 (1.2)	46.6 (8.1)	58.0 (14.4)	62.0 (16.7)	59.6 (15.3)	51.4 (10.8)	37.9 (3.3)	25.1 (−3.8)	12.7 (−10.7)	35.3 (1.8)
Mean minimum °F (°C)	−17.7 (−27.6)	−12.0 (−24.4)	−1.5 (−18.6)	18.6 (−7.4)	31.2 (−0.4)	44.2 (6.8)	51.0 (10.6)	48.9 (9.4)	35.4 (1.9)	23.0 (−5.0)	7.2 (−13.8)	−10.2 (−23.4)	−20.8 (−29.3)
Record low °F (°C)	−35 (−37)	−34 (−37)	−32 (−36)	0 (−18)	12 (−11)	33 (1)	42 (6)	36 (2)	23 (−5)	13 (−11)	−15 (−26)	−32 (−36)	−35 (−37)
Average precipitation inches (mm)	0.87 (22)	0.89 (23)	1.99 (51)	3.18 (81)	4.61 (117)	5.28 (134)	4.79 (122)	4.84 (123)	3.80 (97)	2.48 (63)	1.65 (42)	1.08 (27)	35.46 (902)
Average snowfall inches (cm)	9.5 (24)	10.2 (26)	6.8 (17)	2.6 (6.6)	0.5 (1.3)	0.0 (0.0)	0.0 (0.0)	0.0 (0.0)	0.0 (0.0)	0.3 (0.76)	3.1 (7.9)	11.2 (28)	44.2 (111.56)
Average precipitation days (≥ 0.01 in)	6.9	5.6	7.7	10.6	12.4	11.9	9.6	9.7	8.6	8.9	6.1	7.1	105.1
Average snowy days (≥ 0.1 in)	4.9	3.9	2.5	0.8	0.0	0.0	0.0	0.0	0.0	0.3	1.8	4.6	18.8
Source 1: NOAA
Source 2: National Weather Service

== Demographics ==
Historical population
Census	Pop.	Note	%±
1860	609		—
1870	2,070		239.9%
1880	3,161		52.7%
1890	3,849		21.8%
1900	5,561		44.5%
1910	5,658		1.7%
1920	7,252		28.2%
1930	7,654		5.5%
1940	8,694		13.6%
1950	10,191		17.2%
1960	13,409		31.6%
1970	15,341		14.4%
1980	18,632		21.5%
1990	19,386		4.0%
2000	22,434		15.7%
2010	25,599		14.1%
2020	26,420		3.2%
2022 (est.)	26,470		0.2%
U.S. Decennial Census; 2020 Census

=== 2020 census ===
As of the 2020 census, Owatonna had a population of 26,420. The median age was 38.8 years. 25.2% of residents were under the age of 18 and 17.6% of residents were 65 years of age or older. For every 100 females there were 98.0 males, and for every 100 females age 18 and over there were 96.6 males age 18 and over.

99.4% of residents lived in urban areas, while 0.6% lived in rural areas.

There were 10,584 households in Owatonna, of which 30.6% had children under the age of 18 living in them. Of all households, 49.0% were married-couple households, 18.5% were households with a male householder and no spouse or partner present, and 25.3% were households with a female householder and no spouse or partner present. About 29.8% of all households were made up of individuals and 12.9% had someone living alone who was 65 years of age or older.

There were 11,139 housing units, of which 5.0% were vacant. The homeowner vacancy rate was 1.3% and the rental vacancy rate was 6.6%.

Racial composition as of the 2020 census
Race	Number	Percent
White	22,048	83.5%
Black or African American	1,322	5.0%
American Indian and Alaska Native	92	0.3%
Asian	292	1.1%
Native Hawaiian and Other Pacific Islander	20	0.1%
Some other race	1,108	4.2%
Two or more races	1,538	5.8%
Hispanic or Latino (of any race)	2,539	9.6%

=== 2010 census ===
As of the census of 2010, there were 25,599 people, 10,068 households, and 6,737 families resided in the city. The population density was 1,761.8 inhabitants per square mile (680.2/km^{2}). There were 10,724 housing units at an average density of 738.1 per square mile (285.0/km^{2}). The racial makeup of the city was 91.2% White, 3.8% African American, 0.3% Native American, 0.9% Asian, 2.2% from other races, and 1.5% from two or more races. Hispanic or Latino of any race were 7.3% of the population.

There were 10,068 households, of which 34.1% had children under the age of 18 living with them, 52.9% were married couples living together, 10.0% had a female householder with no husband present, 4.0% had a male householder with no wife present, and 33.1% were non-families. 27.9% of all households were made up of individuals, and 11.4% had someone living alone who was 65 years of age or older. The average household size was 2.49 and the average family size was 3.05.

The median age in the city was 37.2 years. 26.9% of residents were under the age of 18; 7.3% were between the ages of 18 and 24; 26.3% were from 25 to 44; 25.5% were from 45 to 64; and 13.8% were 65 years of age or older. The gender makeup of the city was 48.8% male and 51.2% female.

=== 2000 census ===
As of the census of 2000, 22,434 people, 8,704 households, and 5,936 families resided in the city. The population density was 1,779.9 inhabitants per square mile (687.2/km^{2}). There were 8,940 housing units at an average density of 709.3 per square mile (273.9/km^{2}). The racial makeup of the city was 94.09% White, 1.56% African American, 0.13% Native American, 0.99% Asian, 0.03% Pacific Islander, 1.92% from other races, and 1.27% from two or more races. Hispanic or Latino of any race were 4.31% of the population.

There were 8,704 households, of which 35.4% had children under the age of 18 living with them, 56.5% were married couples living together, 8.4% had a female householder with no husband present, and 31.8% were non-families. 26.6% of all households were made up of individuals, and 10.5% had someone living alone who was 65 years of age or older. The average household size was 2.52 and the average family size was 3.08.

In the city, the population was spread out, with 28.1% under the age of 18, 8.4% from 18 to 24, 29.8% from 25 to 44, 20.8% from 45 to 64, and 12.9% who were 65 years of age or older. The median age was 35. For every 100 females, there were 95.0 males. For every 100 females age 18 and over, there were 90.5 males.

The median income for a household in the city was $45,660, and the median income for a family was $54,883. Males had a median income of $37,691 versus $25,511 for females. The per capita income for the city was $20,513. About 4.3% of families and 6.6% of the population were below the poverty line, including 7.9% of those under 18 and 6.9% of those 65 or over.

== Economy ==
Owatonna is an economic center of Southern Minnesota, with diverse industries. Federated Insurance is the largest employer, with 1,521 employees, followed by an expanding Viracon, which has 1,434 employees. Both have their corporate headquarters in Owatonna. Other large employers in the community are Bosch, Jostens, Gopher Sport, Brunswick Corporation (Cybex International), Daikin Industries, Climate by Design (CDI), AmesburyTruth, ISD 761, Wenger Corporation, Owatonna Clinic - Mayo Health System, and Owatonna Hospital - Allina Hospitals & Clinics.

== Arts and culture ==
In 1974, the City of Owatonna purchased the campus of the former Minnesota State Public School for Dependent and Neglected Children, which had been in operation from 1886 until 1945. The site was renamed West Hills, and now serves as an administrative center for the City of Owatonna, as well as housing several nonprofit organizations in the various historic buildings, including the Owatonna Arts Center. Little Theatre of Owatonna has called Merrill Hall in the West hills their home since 1966

The ongoing practical joke Pesky Pants took place in Owatonna between 1965 and 1989

=== Sites of interest ===
==== National Farmers Bank ====
In the middle of Owatonna's downtown is the National Farmer's Bank, widely recognized as one of the premier examples of the Prairie School of architecture in America. Designed by Louis Sullivan, the building was finished in 1908 and features gold leaf arches, stained-glass windows, and nouveau Baroque art designs, all still in pristine condition. It is a national landmark on the National Register of Historic Places and functions as a branch of Wells Fargo Bank.

==== State School Museum ====
The State School Museum is at West Hills on the grounds of the former Minnesota State School for Dependent and Neglected Children.

== Sports ==
The Steele County Blades is a junior hockey team that plays at Four Seasons Center and is a member of the Minnesota Junior Hockey League. Although having a similar name and logo, this team is unrelated to the former Southern Minnesota Express, which relocated to Michigan to become the Motor City Machine. The Express began play in the 2008–2009 season, and completed its final season in March 2011.

== Government ==
Owatonna is governed by a mayor and city council. City Council of Owatonna, MN

- Mayor: Matt Jessop

City council

- Council member at large: Doug Voss
- Council member at large: Daniel Boeke
- First Ward: Nathan Dotson
- Second Ward: Greg Schultz
- Third Ward: Dave Burbank
- Fourth Ward: Kevin P. Raney
- Fifth Ward: Brent Svenby

The city is in Minnesota's 24th Senate District, represented by John Jasinski, a Republican. District 24 includes portions of Steele, Rice and Waseca and Dodge counties in the southeastern part of the state. Owatonna is in House District 24A, represented by State Representative John Petersburg, a Republican, since 2012.

Owatonna is in Minnesota's 1st congressional district, represented by Brad Finstad, a Republican.

== Education ==
=== Public schools ===
Public education is provided by Independent School District No. 761

==== Elementary schools ====
- Lincoln Elementary, grades K-5
- McKinley Elementary, grades K-5
- Washington Elementary, grades K-5
- Wilson Elementary, grades K-5

==== Middle school ====
- Owatonna Middle School, grades 6-8

==== High school ====
- Owatonna Senior High School , grades 9–12
- Owatonna Alternative Learning Center (ALC), grades 7–12

=== Private schools ===
- Owatonna Christian School, grades K-12
- St. Marys Catholic School, grades K-8
- Marian Catholic High School, 1958–1975
- Pillsbury Baptist Bible College, 1886–2008

=== Higher education ===
- Riverland Community College

=== Past schools ===
- "Old" Lincoln Elementary School, 1885–1951
- Roosevelt Elementary School, 1919–1980
- Jefferson Elementary School, early 1900s-1970
- First Owatonna High School, 1871–1882
- Second Owatonna High School, 1883–1921
- Third Owatonna High School, 1921–2023
- Minnesota State School for Dependent and Neglected Children, 1887–1945
- Owatonna State School, 1947–1970
- Willow Creek Intermediate School, 1990–2017
- Owatonna Junior High school 1965–2017

=== Owatonna Art Education Project ===
In Owatonna was the Owatonna Art Education Project.

== Media ==
=== AM radio ===
AM radio stations
Frequency	Call sign	Name	Format	Owner
920	KDHL	The Mighty 920	Classic Country	Townsquare Media
1170	KFOW		Sports radio	Linder Radio Group
1390	KRFO		Oldies	Townsquare Media

=== FM Radio ===
FM radio stations
Frequency	Call sign	Name	Format	Owner
92.1	KRUE	KRUE Country 92.1	Country	Linder Radio Group
93.5	K228DR (KJLY Translator)		Christian	Minn-Iowa Christian Broadcasting
100.9	KOWZ		Adult Contemporary	Linder Radio Group
103.9	K280EC (KNGA Translator)	MPR News	NPR	Minnesota Public Radio
104.9	KRFO		Country	Townsquare Media
105.7	K289AE (KGAC Translator)	Classical MPR	Classical	Minnesota Public Radio
106.3	K292GU (KFOW Translator)		Sports radio	Linder Radio Group
107.5	KBGY (KLCI Simulcast)	BOB-FM	Classic country	Milestone Radio II, LLC

=== Film location ===
Parts of the 1995 movie Angus were filmed in and around Owatonna, including Owatonna Senior High School, its football team, and marching band.

Much of the 2014 silent film The Root of Evil was shot on location in Owatonna, most notably at the Owatonna Senior High School and the Gainey Center. Produced by a cast and crew of over 60 Owatonna High School students, the film has received 10 awards at over eight film festivals on the international circuit. Memorabilia from the film is set to be on display in the high school museum.

== Transportation ==
Local bus service in Owatonna is provided by SMART. SMART operates one deviated fixed route and paratransit service.

== Notable people ==
- Ken Christianson, artist and musician, graduate of Owatonna Senior High
- Billy Conway, musician, drummer known for his work with Treat Her Right and Morphine
- Masanori Mark Christianson, art director and musician, graduate of Owatonna Senior High
- Lillian Colton, crop artist
- Casey Driessen, fiddler
- Elijah Easton, farmer and member of the Minnesota House of Representatives
- Arthur Fry, co-creator of the Post-it Note, born in Owatonna
- Theodore Marcus Hansen, Lutheran pastor and educator, pastor in Owatonna from 1948 to 1952
- Mike Hegstrand, professional wrestler, Hawk born in Owatonna
- Noel Jenke, NFL player
- Felix Kaplan, member of the Minnesota House of Representatives
- William R. Kinyon early member of the Minnesota House of Representatives
- Don Laughlin, founder of the resort town of Laughlin, Nevada
- Drew C. MacEwen, state representative in Washington state
- Charles Edward Magoon, politician, lawyer, judge, and diplomat
- E.G. Marshall, actor known for 12 Angry Men
- Maud A. Merrill, psychologist
- Craig Minowa, lead singer of Cloud Cult
- Tom Moore, NFL coach
- Harold S. Nelson, Minnesota state senator and lawyer
- Fred L. Peterson, mayor of Portland, Oregon, from 1953 to 1956
- Connie Ruth, Minnesota state representative
- Tom J. Shea, Minnesota state legislator and businessman
- John Malcolm Smith, fighter pilot in World War 2
- Clifford C. Sommer, Minnesota state senator and businessman
- Amy Tanner, psychologist who wrote Studies in Spiritism, born in Owatonna
- Sean Tillman a.k.a. Har Mar Superstar, raised in Owatonna
- Evan S. Tyler, North Dakota state representative
- Harry Williams, songwriter, director for Mack Sennett
- Travis Wiuff, a.k.a. "Diesel", MMA fighter, UFC
- Adam Young, singer, founder of Owl City, and co-founder of Windsor Airlift
- William C. Zamboni, Minnesota state senator and mayor of Owatonna
