= KKCK =

Contemporary hit radio station in Springfield–Marshall, Minnesota

Coordinates: 44.365°N 95.324°W

- Springfield, Minnesota; United States
- Broadcast area: Marshall-Redwood Falls
- Frequency: 94.7 MHz
- Branding: 94.7 KKCK

Programming
- Format: Top 40 (CHR)
- Affiliations: Compass Media Networks; United Stations Radio Networks

Ownership
- Owner: Linder Radio Group; (Subarctic Media, LLC)
- Sister stations: KARL, KARZ, KMHL, KNSG

History
- First air date: 1995 (as KNSG)
- Former call signs: KLPR (1990–1995, CP); KNSG (1995–2017); KARZ (2017–2019)

Technical information
- Licensing authority: FCC
- Facility ID: 30124
- Class: C2
- ERP: 50,000 watts
- HAAT: 144 meters

Links
- Public license information: Public file; LMS
- Webcast: Listen Live
- Website: KKCK Online

KKCK (94.7 FM) is a radio station in Marshall, Minnesota (licensed to Springfield), serving the Marshall and Redwood Falls areas. The station is owned by John Linder and operated from the KMHL/KKCK studios in Marshall.

From 1982–2019, KKCK was on FM 99.7 MHz, but moved to FM 94.7 MHz on April 3, 2019.

== History ==
=== First three decades as 99.7 KKCK ===
The station first signed on in 1975 as KMHL-FM (100.1) with a country music format, before switching to Top 40 (CHR) in 1982. KKCK debuted automated with TM Programming's "Stereo Rock" Top 40 format briefly, then converted to fully local programming in the mid-1980s. After the call letter change to KKCK in 1982, the station changed its slogan to "KK100," also known as "Double K 100." KKCK later changed its name to "Fun 100" in the mid-1980s. In 1988, it adopted "FM 100 KKCK" as its slogan after upgrading from 3,000 watts at 100.1 FM to 100,000 watts at 99.7 FM. The station repositioned as "99-7 KKCK" with the "Always A Better Music Mix" slogan in 1992. The station had significant listenership in the Sioux Falls, South Dakota market during the 1990s, despite its transmitter tower being located over 50 miles away, as it was the de facto Top 40/CHR for Sioux Falls until KKLS-FM flipped to "Hot 104.7" in 1997. The station primarily focuses on Marshall, Minnesota, the surrounding southwestern Minnesota region, and the nearby Brookings, South Dakota area.

Unlike most Top 40/CHR formatted stations, KKCK had flexibility to introduce new music to listeners (including, but not limited to, Top 40 (CHR), Rhythmic, Dance Radio/EDM, and Mainstream Urban) as well as included genres such as indie, alternative, modern rock/active rock, and Hot AC/Modern AC including those genres' new music in its music mix. The station also aired The Shag, a long running alternative rock program, on Sunday nights. It shares a local news department with KMHL, and gets national news from ABC. A large amount of the broadcasting day was live. KKCK is regarded as a heritage Top 40/CHR station, thanks in part to its longevity in the format. KKCK also benefitted from the long reach of its 99.7 FM signal, which has local coverage in Marshall, Minnesota and Brookings, South Dakota, rimshot coverage of Madison and Sioux Falls, South Dakota, and can be regularly received as far north as Watertown, South Dakota and Willmar, Minnesota (north of Redwood Falls), and as far south as Canton, South Dakota (south of Sioux Falls), and Spirit Lake, Iowa (south of Worthington).

A winter storm damaged KKCK's transmitter in December 2015, and the station would broadcast at reduced power for nearly two years. In May 2017, KKCK's programming moved to KNSG (94.7 FM) while the transmitter is being rebuilt. KKCK returned to full power at 99.7 FM around November 2017, with the classic hits format resuming at KNSG.

=== Frequency swap with KARZ ===
On October 16, 2017, KNSG changed their call letters to KARZ.

On April 3, 2019, the heritage Top 40/CHR-formatted KKCK moved to the more eastern signal of the Springfield licensed 94.7 FM, with a fringe signal coverage of Mankato, swapping frequencies with classic hits-formatted KARZ, which moved to the larger coverage area, and the more western signal, of 99.7 FM. KARZ plays many of the songs now included in the classic hits format during KKCK's early years as a Top 40/CHR, and KKCK adopted the "Today's Hit Music" slogan with no format changes.

KKCK's move to 94.7 FM leaves Brookings, South Dakota without a local Top 40/CHR station; however, it is within rimshot coverage of Sioux Falls Top 40/CHR stations KKLS-FM and KQSF. Local college radio station KSDJ does play modern rock/alternative music included in KKCK's rock-leaning CHR format.

In December 2023 KKCK dropped its Top 40/CHR format and began stunting with Christmas music as "K-Santa 94.7". However, on December 26, 2023, KKCK reverted to its Top 40/CHR format.
