= KXLP =

Radio station in Eagle Lake–Mankato, Minnesota

Coordinates: 44.142°N 94.002°W

- Eagle Lake, Minnesota; United States
- Broadcast area: Mankato, Minnesota
- Frequency: 94.1 MHz
- Branding: 94.1 KXLP

Programming
- Format: Classic rock
- Affiliations: United Stations Radio Networks; Minnesota Vikings

Ownership
- Owner: Linder Radio Group; (Subarctic Media, LLC)
- Sister stations: KATO-FM, KDOG, KXAC, KTOE, KFSP

History
- First air date: September 21, 2007; 18 years ago
- Former call signs: KXRP (2007)

Technical information
- Licensing authority: FCC
- Facility ID: 164248
- Class: A
- ERP: 3,700 watts
- HAAT: 121 m (397 ft)

Links
- Public license information: Public file; LMS
- Webcast: Listen Live
- Website: kxlp941.com

KXLP (94.1 FM) is a radio station in Mankato, Minnesota (licensed to Eagle Lake) and serving the Minnesota River Valley. The 94.1 FM frequency went on the air September 21, 2007, airing a classic rock format that migrated from a sister station at 93.1 FM. KXLP's license is owned by Subarctic Media, LLC.

== History ==
KXLP has been airing an album-oriented rock format on and off from 1982 to 2007. They flipped to adult contemporary in 1986 as "Lite Rock 93 KXLP" amid a large outcry from loyal listeners. A few years later, they flipped back to rock, shifting toward classic rock in 1995. For many years, they were co-owned with KYSM-FM and KYSM, first by James Ingstad (as Pro Radio Group), then Cumulus Broadcasting, then Clear Channel Communications.

KXLP previously carried the syndicated Bob and Tom show weekday mornings; it currently airs a local morning show. KXLP is a local affiliate for Minnesota Vikings and Minnesota Gophers football.

The station was purchased in August 2007 from Clear Channel by Linder Radio Group, a.k.a. Minnesota Valley Broadcasting Co., which also acquired KYSM (now KFSP). Other current sister stations include KTOE, KDOG, KXAC and KATO-FM.

At 5:00 PM on September 21, 2007, KXLP's on-air staff and rock format moved from 93.1 FM to new sign-on 94.1 FM, which held the temporary call letters KXRP for a week prior. A new format was launched at 93.1 FM.

Effective July 2008, KXLP's signal started simulcasting on new sign-on KHRS (105.9 FM) in the Winthrop/New Ulm area. The simulcast lasted until April 2020, when it switched to a simulcast of country-formatted KEMJ (101.5 FM).
