= Owatonna Art Education Project =

The Owatonna Art Education Project was a project in Owatonna, Minnesota in the United States, intended to promote the production of new knowledge through science, establish standards of excellence in education, and provide opportunities for self-improvement and visual enhancement. It was started 1933, and continued until 1938. The findings were published in 1944.

== Bibliography ==
- Art for Daily Living: The Story of the Owatonna Art Education Project, Edwin Ziegfeld, Mary Elinore Smith, University of Minnesota Press, ISBN 0816672296
- Social Perspectives on Art Education in the U. S.: Teaching Visual Culture in a Democracy, Kerry Freedman, Studies in Art Education, Vol. 41, No. 4 (Summer, 2000), pp. 314–329, Published by: National Art Education Association
