= KNUJ (AM) =

Coordinates: 44°17′10″N 94°25′50″W

- New Ulm, Minnesota; United States
- Frequency: 860 kHz

Programming
- Format: Full-service news/talk

Ownership
- Owner: James Ingstad

History
- First air date: May 22, 1949
- Call sign meaning: K New Ulm Journal

Technical information
- Licensing authority: FCC
- Facility ID: 30122
- Class: D
- Power: 1,000 watts (day); 5 watts (night)
- Translator: 97.3 K247CU (New Ulm)

Links
- Public license information: Public file; LMS
- Webcast: Listen Live
- Website: KNUJ Online

KNUJ (860 AM) is a radio station in New Ulm, Minnesota. The station airs a full service news/talk format and is owned by James Ingstad. KNUJ also has a sister station, KNUJ-FM.

== History ==
KNUJ went on the air May 22, 1949 by Mickelson Media, owner of the New Ulm Journal. Mickelson Media owned the station for over 36 years. In the early 1970s, KNUJ-FM was established on 93.1 FM. That station would become KXLP in 1982.

On March 6, 1986, KNUJ and KXLP were the first two stations purchased by upstart owner James Ingstad, a member of a family that owned radio stations in North Dakota, South Dakota, Minnesota, Iowa and other areas. A few years later, KXLP's studios were moved to Mankato.

A new KNUJ-FM signed on in June 1995, as "BRaT 107.3." The 4,000-watt station licensed to nearby Sleepy Eye played adult contemporary music. Both stations simulcast from 6 to 8:30 am, Monday through Friday, and shorter hours on Saturday. A month later, KNSG in Springfield, Minnesota signed on the air.

On August 14, 1998, Cumulus Broadcasting purchased many stations from Ingstad. Two years later, Cumulus turned around and sold some of the stations, including KNUJ and KNUJ-FM to Clear Channel. The sale became effective on October 2, 2000.

Ingstad obtained the three stations again from Clear Channel in February 2003, as part of a trade for a station in Bismarck, North Dakota. KNSG was spun off to Linder Radio.

KNUJ-FM changed its format to adult hits in June 2005, picking up a satellite-fed syndicated format from Westwood One, and becoming "SAM 107.3."

== Programming ==
KNUJ is mostly a locally oriented news/talk/sports and farm station. In addition, the station airs an hour long polka music weekdays and on Sunday afternoons. The station also plays country music whenever they aren't carrying other types of programming.

Both KNUJ and KNUJ-FM simulcast a common morning show weekdays. KNUJ-FM also broadcasts a live local news show from Sleepy Eye following the show.

KNUJ also operates a separate mail order business known as KNUJ Polka Cassette & CD Sales, selling primarily polka music, nationwide.
