= KXAC =

Radio station in St. James–Mankato, Minnesota

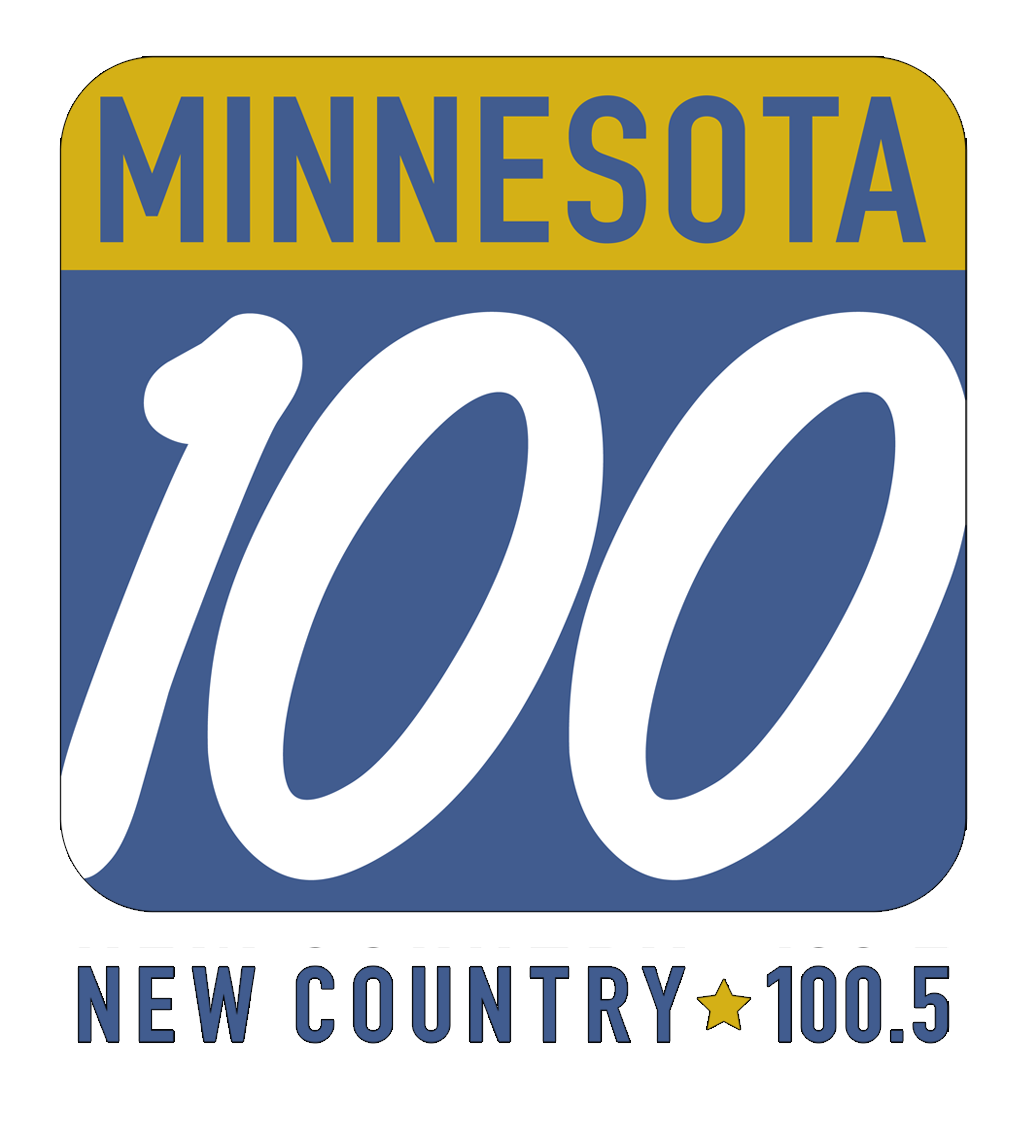
- St. James, Minnesota; United States
- Broadcast area: St. James-Mankato
- Frequency: 100.5 MHz
- Branding: Minnesota 100

Programming
- Format: Country
- Affiliations: Westwood One

Ownership
- Owner: Linder Radio Group; (Subarctic Media, LLC)
- Sister stations: KATO-FM, KDOG, KEMJ, KFSP, KTOE, KXLP, KRRW

History
- First air date: November 1, 1992; 33 years ago

Technical information
- Licensing authority: FCC
- Facility ID: 57429
- Class: C2
- ERP: 34,000 watts
- HAAT: 180 m (591 ft)
- Transmitter coordinates: 43.951°N 94.391°W
- Translator: 102.7 K274AL (Mankato)

Links
- Public license information: Public file; LMS
- Webcast: Listen Live
- Website: kxac.com

KXAC (100.5 FM, "Minnesota 100") is a radio station in Mankato, Minnesota, United States, serving south central Minnesota with a Country music format. The station is licensed to St. James and serves the Mankato area and the Minnesota River Valley. The station is owned by Linder Radio Group.

== History ==
The station went on the air in 1991, playing soft adult contemporary music and later switching to an oldies format in April 2001.

KXAC eventually shifted to classic hits as "Classic Hits 100.5 KXAC", dropping the former "Oldies 100.5" brand.

On November 21, 2018, at 10 a.m., KXAC dropped its classic hits format and began stunting with Christmas music as "100.5 The Christmas Igloo", with a new format to launch after the holidays. On December 26, KXAC relaunched its classic hits format, rebranding as "Magic 100.5".

On September 2, 2022, KXAC dropped its classic hits format and adopted sister station KATO-FM’s country format as Minnesota 100; KATO would flip to a classic hits format skewed towards the 1980s and ’90s.

In July 2023, KXAC added a simulcast on Mankato translator 102.7 K274AL for a clearer signal in the city. K274AL formerly rebroadcast sister station KTOE; that station has since added an FM translator on K254DT (98.7 FM).
