= KFMC-FM =

Coordinates: 43.6291°N 94.4836°W

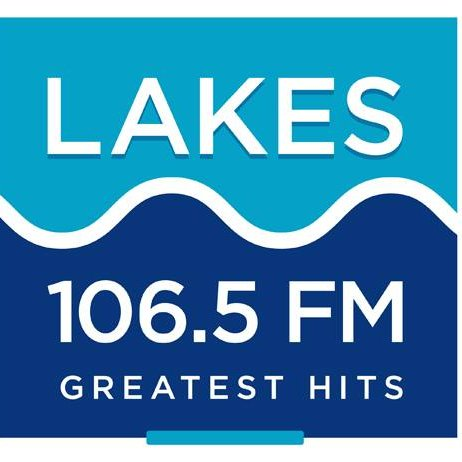
- Fairmont, Minnesota; United States
- Frequency: 106.5 MHz
- Branding: 106-5 Lakes FM

Programming
- Format: Classic hits

Ownership
- Owner: Linder Radio Group; (City of Lakes Media, Inc.)
- Sister stations: KSUM, KEMJ

History
- First air date: 1978

Technical information
- Licensing authority: FCC
- Facility ID: 73657
- Class: C1
- ERP: 100,000 watts
- HAAT: 113 meters (371 ft)

Links
- Public license information: Public file; LMS
- Webcast: Listen Live
- Website: 1065lakesfm.com

KFMC-FM (106.5 FM) is a radio station licensed to Fairmont, Minnesota, serving south central Minnesota and northern Iowa with a 100,000 watt signal. The station airs a classic hits format as "106.5 Lakes FM".

== History ==
KFMC-FM was established by Woodward Broadcasting as an FM companion to KSUM in Fairmont. Charles and Elizabeth Woodward had acquired KSUM in 1962, and their son Charles "Woody" Woodward III joined the station's sales staff on July 1, 1974. According to the Pavek Museum, Woodward moved four years later to a similar position at the newly established KFMC and became station manager before being promoted in 1980 to general manager of both KSUM and KFMC.

FCC records published in Broadcasting show that the commission granted KFMC, Fairmont, Minnesota, a construction permit to replace an expired permit in an action dated May 17, 1978. A later family-history item in the Fairmont Photo Press stated that KFMC-FM went on the air in August 1978. Woody Woodward's obituary described KFMC as the realization of his father Charlie Woodward's FM plan and said the station was remembered within the family as "K-FM-Charlie". Robert Laird, a former general manager of Woodward Broadcasting Corporation, was also credited locally with helping put KFMC on the air.

A Minnesota broadcasters directory listed KFMC-FM on 106.5 MHz under Woodward Broadcasting, Inc., with Charles Woodward as president, Donald Kliewer as vice president and Marilyn Borchardt as secretary-treasurer. At the time, the station was listed with an adult contemporary format, AP wire service, Magnet/Mutual network affiliations, 100,000 watts of power, a 400-foot antenna and 24-hour operation.

Agricultural programming was also part of the KSUM/KFMC operation. Woodward was one of the founders of the Minnesota Ag Network, known as MAGNET. In 2017, KSUM and KFMC added Linder Farm Network programming; Woody Woodward said agriculture was important to the stations' listening area and that the stations were proud to join the network.

KFMC later adopted a classic rock format. According to NorthPine, that format began in 2003 and continued until 2018. During the Woodward era, the KSUM/KFMC cluster also maintained a collection of vintage radios and broadcast equipment at its Fairmont offices for station tours.

In January 2018, the Federal Communications Commission accepted for filing applications to assign KSUM and KFMC-FM from Woodward Broadcasting, Inc. to City of Lakes Media, Inc. The sale closed on May 31, 2018, ending Woodward Broadcasting's 56-year family ownership legacy in Fairmont.

On July 9, 2018, KFMC dropped classic rock and launched a classic hits format as "106.5 Lakes FM". NorthPine reported that the new format began at noon with Prince's "1999", following a weekend stunt loop of Rolf Harris' "Tie Me Kangaroo Down, Sport".
