= KRUE =

Coordinates: 44.046°N 93.384°W

- Waseca, Minnesota; United States
- Broadcast area: Owatonna-Waseca
- Frequency: 92.1 MHz
- Branding: KRUE Country 92.1

Programming
- Format: Country

Ownership
- Owner: Linder Radio Group; (Main Street Broadcasting, Inc.)
- Sister stations: KFOW, KOWZ

History
- First air date: August 22, 1972; 53 years ago (as KQDE-FM)
- Former call signs: KQDE-FM (1972–1984); KOWO-FM (1984–1993); KRUE (1993–2012); KKOR (2012–2015)

Technical information
- Licensing authority: FCC
- Facility ID: 70930
- Class: C3
- ERP: 9,800 watts
- HAAT: 162 meters (531 ft)

Links
- Public license information: Public file; LMS
- Webcast: Listen Live
- Website: krue92.com

KRUE (92.1 FM) is a radio station broadcasting a country music format. Licensed to serve Waseca, Minnesota, the station serves the Owatonna-Waseca area. The station is owned by Linder Radio Group.

== History ==
The station began in 1972 as KQDE-FM, an FM companion to Waseca AM station KOWO. In July 1972, Broadcasting reported that KOWO Inc. had applied for the KQDE-FM call letters, and the calls were granted the following month. The station was authorized for program operation on August 21, 1972, broadcasting on 92.1 MHz with 3,000 watts of effective radiated power and an antenna height of 300 feet.

KQDE-FM was operated with KOWO by KOWO Inc. through the 1970s. By 1974, the two stations were listed together as KOWO–KQDE-FM Waseca in FCC renewal notices.

In 1984, KOWO and KQDE-FM were sold by KOWO Inc. to Waseca Communications Inc. for $480,000. The seller was majority-owned by Richard and Edwin Darby, while the buyer was majority-owned by Richard Seehafer. Following the sale, the FM station became KOWO-FM. A later FCCInfo call-sign history listed the KOWO-FM call sign as beginning on August 20, 1984. During the Seehafer ownership period, a Minnesota broadcast directory listed KOWO-FM with an adult contemporary/information format and affiliations with Mutual, the Minnesota News Network, and the Motor Racing Network.

In 1991, the Federal Communications Commission upgraded the Waseca FM allocation from Channel 221A to Channel 221C3, conditionally modifying KOWO-FM's license and allowing the station to operate as a higher-class regional FM facility.

The station adopted the KRUE call sign in 1993. The M Street Journal reported the call-sign change from KOWO-FM to KRUE, and FCCInfo later listed the KRUE calls as beginning on April 1, 1993.

In 2012, the KRUE call letters were moved off 92.1 FM as part of a call-sign shuffle. FCC call-sign records show that on June 5, 2012, KRUE-FM became KKOR, while the KRUE calls were assigned to Waseca AM station KOWZ on June 12, 2012. During this period, the FM station was branded as “KORN Country 92.1.” In 2014, Scott Fybush described the Linder Radio Group's Owatonna/Waseca cluster as including classic country KRUE 1170 Waseca, “KORN Country” KKOR 92.1 Waseca, and KOWZ 100.9 Blooming Prairie.

The KKOR/KORN Country identity led to a trademark dispute in 2015, when Riverfront Broadcasting sued Main Street Broadcasting over the use of the KORN name. The complaint stated that the Waseca station's FCC call sign was KKOR, not KORN, while alleging that the station used “K-O-R-N Country 92.1” branding on air and online. Amid the dispute, the station dropped the KORN Country branding, became “Krue Country,” and returned to the KRUE call sign. The FCC recorded the call-sign change from KKOR to KRUE as effective July 13, 2015.

In September 2016, KRUE and sister station KOWZ-FM suffered transmitter damage after flooding affected the stations’ facilities. NorthPine reported that KRUE temporarily operated at reduced power while repairs were pending.

In 2024, the FCC granted assignment of KRUE's license from Main Street Broadcasting to Blooming Prairie Farm Radio, Inc. The following year, the FCC granted a transfer of control of Blooming Prairie Farm Radio from J. David Linder to Thomas Linder.

As of 2026, KRUE is operated as part of KOWZ Media and airs a country format branded as “Your Country” and “Southern Minnesota's Home for Country's Greatest Hits.”
