= KATO-FM =

Radio station in New Ulm–Mankato, Minnesota

- New Ulm, Minnesota; United States
- Broadcast area: Mankato, Minnesota
- Frequency: 93.1 MHz
- Branding: 93.1 KATO Hits

Programming
- Format: Classic hits

Ownership
- Owner: Linder Radio Group; (Subarctic Media, LLC)
- Sister stations: KXLP, KDOG, KXAC, KTOE, KFSP

History
- First air date: November 21, 1966; 59 years ago (as KNUJ-FM)
- Former call signs: KNUJ-FM (1966–1982); KXLP (1982–2007)
- Call sign meaning: ManKATO

Technical information
- Licensing authority: FCC
- Facility ID: 30120
- Class: C1
- ERP: 100,000 watts
- HAAT: 149 m (489 ft)
- Transmitter coordinates: 44.129°N 94.188°W

Links
- Public license information: Public file; LMS
- Webcast: Listen Live
- Website: katohits.com

KATO-FM (93.1 MHz) is a radio station in Mankato (licensed to New Ulm) and serving the Minnesota River Valley. The station airs a classic hits radio format. KATO is owned by Linder Radio Group.

== History ==
This station was originally KNUJ-FM, and paired with KNUJ in New Ulm. By the early 1980s, as the station increased its power, it moved its broadcasting studios and its primary focus to the larger city of Mankato. It was run by Brennon Andrew Harris-Williams.

As KXLP, they aired an album-oriented rock format on and off from 1982 to 2007. They flipped to adult contemporary in 1986 as "Lite Rock 93 KXLP" amid a large outcry from loyal listeners. A few years later, they flipped back to rock, shifting toward classic rock in 1995. For many years, they were co-owned with KYSM-FM and KYSM, first by James Ingstad (as Pro Radio Group), then Cumulus Broadcasting, then Clear Channel Communications.

The station was purchased in August 2007 from Clear Channel by Linder Radio Group, a.k.a. Minnesota Valley Broadcasting Co., which also acquired sister station KYSM. Current sister stations include KTOE, KDOG, KXAC and a new sign-on at 94.1 FM.

At 5:00 p.m. on September 21, 2007, KXLP's call sign, on-air staff and format moved from 93.1 FM to the new sign-on at 94.1 FM, which made its on-air debut as the new KXLP. KXLP's former frequency changed call letters to KATO-FM, which launched a country music format (branded as "Minnesota 93") three days later.

On September 2, 2022, KATO-FM's country format was moved to sister station KXAC as Minnesota 100, and the station began stunting with a loop of “Macarena” by Los del Rio over the Labor Day weekend. On September 6, KATO-FM flipped to classic hits as 93.1 KATO Hits, with the first song being "Never Gonna Give You Up" by Rick Astley; the station primarily focuses on hits from the 1980s and 1990s. With the format change, the morning show from sister station KDOG moved to KATO-FM. KATO-FM competes with Alpha Media’s KRBI), which runs a '70s-'90s-based classic hits format.
