= Linder Radio Group =

Linder Radio Group is a media company based in Mankato, Minnesota, USA. It owns and operates 19 radio stations in southern Minnesota. The company is owned by the family of John Linder.

The Linder Radio Group also owns and operates the Linder Farm Network, typically referred to simply as LFN, a radio news network in the U.S. state of Minnesota focusing on farm markets and agricultural news.

== Radio stations ==
Fairmont, Minnesota

- KFMC-FM 106.5 "106-5 Lakes FM" (Classic hits)
- KSUM AM 1370 (Country)
- KEMJ 101.5 "101-5 The Emoji" (Hot AC)

Mankato, Minnesota

- KATO-FM 93.1 (Classic Hits)
- KXLP 94.1 (Classic rock)
- KDOG 96.7 "Hot 96-7" (CHR/Top 40)
- KXAC 100.5 "Minnesota 100" (Country)
- KFSP 1230/103.1 "The Fan Mankato" (Sports)
- KTOE 1420/102.7 (News/talk)

Marshall, Minnesota

- KARZ 99.7 (Classic hits)
- KKCK 94.7 (CHR/Top 40)
- KARL 105.1 (Country)
- KNSG 107.5 (Sports)
- KMHL 1400 (News/talk)

New Ulm, Minnesota

- KRRW 105.9 "Northstar Country 105.9" (Classic country)

Owatonna-Waseca, Minnesota

- KRUE 92.1 (Country)
- KOWZ 100.9 (Classic hits/AC)
- KFOW 1170 "The Fan Owatonna" (Sports)

Rochester, Minnesota

- KNXR 97.5 "Minnesota 97-5" (Classic hits)
