= KSUM =

Coordinates: 43°37′45″N 94°29′00″W

- Fairmont, Minnesota; United States
- Frequency: 1370 kHz C-QUAM AM Stereo
- Branding: AM 1370 & FM 97.1 KSUM

Programming
- Format: Country music

Ownership
- Owner: Linder Radio Group; (City of Lakes Media, Inc.)
- Sister stations: KFMC-FM, KEMJ

History
- First air date: December 31, 1948

Technical information
- Licensing authority: FCC
- Facility ID: 73656
- Class: B
- Power: 1,000 watts
- Translator: 97.1 K246CW (Fairmont)

Links
- Public license information: Public file; LMS
- Webcast: Listen Live
- Website: KSUM

KSUM (1370 AM) is a radio station licensed to Fairmont, Minnesota. The station broadcasts a country music format and is owned by City of Lakes Media.

Former logo

On August 21, 2020, the station also began broadcasting on 97.1 MHz from its translator, K246CW, located at the same site as the AM facility and its sister station, KFMC.

== History ==
KSUM traces its origin to Fairmont Broadcasting Company. A December 28, 1948 verification letter from the company stated that the station had been heard during its initial equipment test period on November 20, 1948. The letter said KSUM would be inaugurated on January 1, 1949, as a 1,000-watt station, operating daily from 6 a.m. to midnight and using a three-tower, two-pattern directional antenna system aimed north; during the test reception, however, it was operating non-directionally from a single tower. The National Radio Club's DX News also reported that KSUM officially opened on January 1, 1949, with its signal beamed north.

In 1950, the Federal Communications Commission granted Leo J. Seifert acquisition of control of Fairmont Broadcasting Company through stock purchases from Charles Potter, George Wilson, Harold Westby and L. C. Meyer. The transaction gave Seifert a 56.7 percent interest in the company, and Broadcasting Telecasting reported that KSUM was assigned 1 kW fulltime on 1370 kHz. A 1952 AM-FM directory listed KSUM at 1370 kHz, licensed to Fairmont Broadcasting Company at 103 S. North Ave. in Fairmont, with 1,000 watts unlimited, DA-2 operation, and affiliation with the Mutual Broadcasting System.

KSUM was later owned for many years by the Woodward family. According to the Pavek Museum's Minnesota Broadcasters Hall of Fame profile of Charles "Woody" Woodward, Woodward's parents purchased KSUM in 1962. Woody Woodward joined KSUM's sales staff on July 1, 1974, later moved to the newly established KFMC, and became general manager of both KSUM and KFMC in 1980. The Minnesota Anniversary & Directory listed KSUM-AM 1370 as a Woodward Broadcasting, Inc. station, with Charles Woodward as president, Donald Kliewer as vice president and Marilyn Borchardt as secretary-treasurer. The same listing described KSUM as a country station with Magnet-Mutual network affiliations, Associated Press wire service, 1,000 watts of power and operating hours from 5:30 a.m. to midnight.

Agricultural programming became a major part of KSUM's local service. KSUM reported in 2023 that Mike Murphy became farm director at Woodward Broadcasting in 1983 after the death of farm director Marv Carlson, and that Murphy reported daily markets, covered agricultural events and broadcast from the Martin County Fair for 42 years before being inducted into the National Association of Farm Broadcasting Hall of Fame. In 2017, KSUM added programming from the Linder Farm Network. The Fairmont Photo Press reported that the network would join KSUM's longtime farm programming and described the station's agricultural service as a central part of its mission in southern Minnesota and northern Iowa.

In January 2018, City of Lakes Media agreed to buy KSUM and sister station KFMC-FM from Charles V. Woodward's Woodward Broadcasting for $800,000. NorthPine reported that the sale documents included non-compete and consulting agreements for Woodward, who had owned the Fairmont stations for several decades.

After the sale, City of Lakes Media pursued an FM translator for KSUM. In 2018, the FCC accepted for filing an application for new FM translator K246CW at 97.1 MHz in Fairmont. NorthPine reported in August 2020 that K246CW had signed on relaying KSUM's country format, and that the translator had been granted as part of the FCC's AM Revitalization effort. The FCC granted license renewals for both KSUM and K246CW on March 22, 2021.

KSUM remains licensed to Fairmont on 1370 kHz. The FCC public file lists the station as Facility ID 73656, licensed to City of Lakes Media, Inc., with a main studio at 1371 West Lair Road in Fairmont. The station's own information page brands KSUM as "Today's Best Country and the All-Time Favorites" and lists featured programming including local sports, Linder Farm Network programming, Minnesota Twins, Minnesota Gophers, Minnesota Wild and Fairmont Cardinals play-by-play.
