= KMHL =

Radio station in Marshall, Minnesota

- Marshall, Minnesota; United States
- Frequency: 1400 kHz
- Branding: 1400 AM/101.7 FM KMHL

Programming
- Format: News/talk; classic Country
- Affiliations: ABC News Radio; Linder Farm Network; Fox Sports Radio; Minnesota Twins

Ownership
- Owner: Linder Radio Group; (Subarctic Media, LLC)
- Sister stations: KARL; KARZ; KKCK; KNSG

History
- First air date: November 30, 1946
- Call sign meaning: Marshall

Technical information
- Licensing authority: FCC
- Facility ID: 32999
- Class: C
- Power: 1,000 watts
- Transmitter coordinates: 44°26′59″N 95°45′43″W
- Translator: 101.7 K269GR (Marshall)

Links
- Public license information: Public file; LMS
- Webcast: Listen live
- Website: www.marshallradio.net/kmhl

KMHL (1400 AM) is a radio station broadcasting a full service news/talk and classic country format serving Marshall, Minnesota. Since its inception, the station has been owned by Linder Radio Group. The station first signed on the air on November 30, 1946. KMHL also rebroadcasts on FM translator K269GR 101.7 FM in Marshall.

As a Linder-owned station, KMHL is a primary outlet for the Linder Farm Network, providing critical market data and weather reports to the southwest Minnesota agricultural community. The station is an official broadcast partner of the Treasure Island Baseball Network, carrying all Minnesota Twins regular season games for the Marshall market. Additionally, it serves as a regional affiliate for the Minnesota Timberwolves. KMHL is a member of the Minnesota News Network sports feed, providing comprehensive coverage of the Minnesota Golden Gophers football and basketball programs. Overnight programming is supplemented by Fox Sports Radio, providing national sports talk during late-night hours.

== History ==
KMHL officially began broadcasting on November 30, 1946. The station was founded by Harry J. Linder, a pioneer in Minnesota broadcasting who established several regional stations following World War II to serve rural communities. The call letters were specifically chosen as a contraction of the city of license, Marshall. The station has remained under the influence of the Linder family for nearly its entire existence. In 2013, ownership was transferred from Don Linder to John Linder. More recently, in April 2025, an application was filed to transfer control of the license from Subarctic Media, LLC to Thomas Linder.

== Translators ==
KMHL broadcasts on the following FM translator:

| Call sign | Frequency | City of license | FID | ERP (W) | Class | FCC info |
|---|---|---|---|---|---|---|
| K269GR | 101.7 FM | Marshall, Minnesota | 63343 | 250 | D | LMS |
