= KARL =

Radio station in Tracy–Marshall, Minnesota

- Tracy, Minnesota; United States
- Broadcast area: Marshall, Minnesota
- Frequency: 105.1 MHz
- Branding: 105.1 KARL

Programming
- Format: Commercial; Classic Country
- Affiliations: Real Country, Associated Press Radio Network, Linder Farm Network, Minnesota Vikings

Ownership
- Owner: Linder Radio Group; (Subarctic Media, LLC)
- Sister stations: KARZ, KKCK, KMHL, KNSG

History
- First air date: July 19, 1994
- Call sign meaning: pronounced as carl

Technical information
- Licensing authority: FCC
- Facility ID: 35129
- Class: C2
- ERP: 45,000 watts
- HAAT: 153 meters
- Transmitter coordinates: 44°19′32″N 95°52′19″W

Links
- Public license information: Public file; LMS
- Webcast: Listen Live
- Website: KARL Online

KARL (105.1 FM) is a radio station broadcasting a Classic Country format in Marshall, Minnesota (licensed to Tracy). The station is currently owned by Linder Radio Group. It carries Westwood One's "Real Country" music format satellite network, but prior to May 2019, it carried Westwood One's "Hot Country" music format satellite network since its sign-on in 1994.

KARL first signed on the air on July 19, 1994. The station began transitioning to older country music in May 2019.

KARL is a member of the Linder Farm Network, which provides agricultural updates to the region's farming community.
