= William C. Zamboni =

American politician (1872–1931)

William C. Zamboni (July 6, 1872 – January 5, 1931) was an American businessman and politician.

He was born in Owatonna, Steele County, Minnesota, and graduated from Owatonna High School in 1889. He graduated from Drew College of Pharmacy in 1892 and went to the Northwestern Institute of Pharmacy and Chemistry. Zamboni lived in Owatonna and was a proprietary medicines manufacturer. Zamboni served as mayor Owatonna. He also served on the Owatonna School Board and was the school board clerk. Zamboni served in the Minnesota Senate from 1923 to 1930.
