= KRBI-FM =

Coordinates: 44.172°N 94.040°W

- St. Peter, Minnesota; United States
- Broadcast area: Mankato, Minnesota
- Frequency: 105.5 MHz
- Branding: River 105

Programming
- Format: Classic hits

Ownership
- Owner: Connoisseur Media; (Alpha 3E Licensee LLC)
- Sister stations: KEEZ-FM, KMKO-FM, KYSM-FM

History
- First air date: 1966

Technical information
- Licensing authority: FCC
- Facility ID: 31873
- Class: C3
- ERP: 25,000 watts
- HAAT: 67.6 m (222 ft)

Links
- Public license information: Public file; LMS
- Webcast: Listen live
- Website: river105.com

KRBI-FM (105.5 FM, "River 105") is an American radio station licensed to serve the community of St. Peter, Minnesota and broadcasting to the Mankato area and the Minnesota River Valley. It currently airs a classic hits music format.

The station is owned by Connoisseur, along with KEEZ, KYSM-FM and KMKO-FM.

From 1966 until 2000, KRBI-FM simulcast with its AM sister at 1310 AM. In later years, the FM station aired an adult contemporary format, with a heavy focus on its hometown of St. Peter. After increasing power from 3,000 to 25,000 watts, improving its signal into Mankato and other nearby cities, KRBI-FM flipped to a more regionally focused classic rock format as "River 105" on September 12, 2000. The St. Peter-oriented programming shifted to its AM sister, KRBI 1310 AM.

KRBI-FM switched its moniker to "The Buzzard" in April 2006.

On January 4, 2010, KRBI-FM changed their format to classic hits, branded as "105.5 The River".

On May 1, 2012, KRBI-FM changed their format from classic hits to adult contemporary, still branded as "105.5 The River".

As of 2018, KRBI-FM has flipped back to classic hits, and slightly rebranded as "River 105".

In June 2024, KRBI began airing Westwood One's "Classic Hits" format full-time as a result of staffing cuts initiated across many of Alpha Media's stations nationwide, including in Mankato.

In May 2025, Connoisseur Media announced its intent to acquire Alpha Media. The FCC approved the sale on August 13, 2025, and the sale was consummated on September 4.
