= KOWZ (FM) =

- Blooming Prairie, Minnesota; United States
- Broadcast area: Owatonna-Waseca/Minneapolis-St. Paul
- Frequency: 100.9 MHz
- RDS: PS: KOWZ-FM; RT: Artist - Title on KOWZ 100.9
- Branding: Kowz 100.9

Programming
- Format: Adult contemporary
- Affiliations: ABC News

Ownership
- Owner: Linder Radio Group; (Blooming Prairie Farm Radio Inc.)
- Sister stations: KFOW, KRUE

History
- First air date: 1994
- Former call signs: KJST (1994); KOWZ (1994–2003); KOWZ-FM (2003–2020)
- Call sign meaning: pronounced as cows

Technical information
- Facility ID: 5874
- Class: C1
- ERP: 100,000 watts
- HAAT: 189 meters (620 ft)
- Transmitter coordinates: 44.046°N 93.384°W

Links
- Webcast: Listen Live
- Website: kowzfm.com

KOWZ (100.9 FM) is a radio station licensed to Blooming Prairie, Minnesota and serving the Owatonna-Waseca/Minneapolis-St. Paul area. KOWZ carries a full service adult contemporary format.

KOWZ (pronounced as "cows") is owned by Linder Radio Group, which owns radio stations in Owatonna, Mankato, St. James, and Marshall

== History ==
The 100.9 MHz facility in Blooming Prairie was in the construction permit stage by 1994. In September 1994, The M Street Journal reported that KOWZ(CP) had changed call letters to KJST, noting that the Federal Communications Commission had rescinded the KOWZ calls on August 5, 1994.

In 1995, Blooming Prairie Farm Radio received approval to upgrade KOWZ from Class A to Class C1. The upgrade authorized a 100,000-watt facility with a 189-meter antenna height, giving the station regional coverage across southern Minnesota.

KOWZ was reported on the air testing in 1995. FMedia! reported that the station was testing formats, interviewing people at a fair about what music the new station should play, and inviting listeners to write to the station in Blooming Prairie. The test programming reportedly ranged from polka and oldies to rock, standards, and country, with IDs mentioning Austin, Albert Lea, Faribault, Waseca, Owatonna, Northfield, Mankato, "and beyond". A DX log published by the Worldwide TV-FM DX Association also reported hearing KOWZ on August 3, 1995, describing the station as "new to air" and testing while seeking listener input on the format.

According to a history published by the Owatonna Area Chamber of Commerce and Tourism, Lynn Ketelsen and John Linder built KOWZ-FM in Owatonna in 1996. Blooming Prairie Farm Radio later acquired KRUE and what became KFOW.

In 1999, John Linder acquired a 50 percent interest in KOWZ from Lynn Ketelsen for $250,000 in stock. At the time, Broadcasting & Cable listed the station as operating on 100.9 MHz with 100,000 watts and an Oldies/AC format.

KOWZ-FM's transmitter site was affected by flooding in September 2010, when NorthPine reported that 18 to 24 inches of water entered the transmitter building south of Meriden. KOWZ-FM was off the air from about midnight on September 24 until about 4 p.m. on September 25, then returned at reduced power. The station again operated at reduced power following flood damage in September 2016.

In 2025, the FCC granted a transfer of control of Blooming Prairie Farm Radio's KOWZ license from J. David Linder to Thomas Linder.
