= KEEZ-FM =

Radio station in Mankato, Minnesota

Coordinates: 44.052°N 94.300°W

- Mankato, Minnesota; United States
- Frequency: 99.1 MHz
- Branding: Z99; Mankato's 99.1

Programming
- Language: English
- Format: Hot adult contemporary
- Affiliations: Westwood One

Ownership
- Owner: Connoisseur Media; (Alpha 3E Licensee LLC)
- Sister stations: KMKO-FM; KRBI-FM; KYSM-FM

History
- First air date: April 1, 1968 (as KEYC-FM)
- Former call signs: KEYC-FM (1968–1978)
- Call sign meaning: Z99

Technical information
- Licensing authority: FCC
- Facility ID: 21193
- Class: C1
- ERP: 100,000 watts
- HAAT: 239 m (784 ft)

Links
- Public license information: Public file; LMS
- Webcast: Listen live
- Website: z99mankato.com

KEEZ-FM (99.1 FM, "Z99") is an American radio station licensed to serve the community of Mankato, Minnesota, and serving the Minnesota River Valley. The station broadcasts a hot adult contemporary format. The station is owned by Connoisseur Media, through licensee Alpha 3E Licensee LLC, along with sister stations KYSM-FM, KRBI-FM and KMKO-FM.

== History ==
The station was granted license on May 15, 1968, as KEYC-FM. The station was started by Lee Enterprises, which also owned KEYC-TV. The station was sold in 1977, to Faribault County Broadcasting Co. for $200,000, principally owned by Paul C. Hedberg and his wife. Burke B. Bartell was General manager until the 1980s. The station aired a Top 40/CHR format by the early 1980s, and then shifted to a Hot AC format in August 1992, all under the "Z99" moniker. In 1993, Hedberg Broadcasting sold the station to Nolan Broadcast Group.

From January 1993 to the fall of 2000, KEEZ was owned and operated by Nolan Broadcast Group. KEEZ was managed by Michael E. Nolan, who, along with his father Philip E. Nolan, owned KAUS-AM/KAUS-FM in Austin, Minnesota. In 2000, the station was sold to Three Eagles Communications.

KEEZ's longtime competitor, 96.7 KDOG, was a CHR station from 1984 until shifting to hot AC in 2000. KDOG returned to their CHR roots as "Hot 96.7" in September 2009.

While "Z99" aired a Hot AC format during the daytime hours, it took a Top 40/CHR format at night as the station added hip-hop and R&B songs to their playlist, thus it could be considered an Adult Top 40 station. By 2012, KEEZ completely shifted back to Top 40/CHR.

On October 31, 2018, at midnight, KEEZ began stunting with a loop of Michael Jackson's “Thriller” while branding as "Thriller 99.1". The next day, at 9 a.m., KEEZ relaunched with a hot adult contemporary format as "Mix 99.1".

In May 2024, Alpha Media let go most on-air staffers in their Mankato cluster, which includes KEEZ, as part of nationwide cuts. The following month, KEEZ began airing Westwood One's "Hot AC" format.

On November 11, 2024, at midnight, KEEZ reverted to Top 40/CHR and the "Z99" moniker, with programming coming from Westwood One's "Hits Now!" format.

Ahead of the April 2025 discontinuation of "Hits Now!" by Westwood One, on April 8, KEEZ returned to Hot AC, again airing Westwood One's "Hot AC" format.

In May 2025, Connoisseur Media announced its intent to acquire Alpha Media. The FCC approved the sale on August 13, 2025, and the sale was consummated on September 4.
