= KFOW =

- Waseca, Minnesota; United States
- Broadcast area: South Central Minnesota
- Frequency: 1170 kHz
- Branding: The Fan Owatonna

Programming
- Format: Sports
- Affiliations: KFXN-FM; Minnesota Vikings; Minnesota Wild

Ownership
- Owner: Linder Radio Group; (Main Street Broadcasting, Inc.)
- Sister stations: KOWZ, KRUE

History
- First air date: December 22, 1971
- Former call signs: KOWO (1971–2003); KOWZ (2003–2012, 2015–2020); KRUE (2012–2015)
- Call sign meaning: Faribault and Owatonna

Technical information
- Licensing authority: FCC
- Facility ID: 70931
- Class: D
- Power: 2,500 watts (day); 1,000 watts (critical hours); 5 watts (night)
- Transmitter coordinates: 44°02′45″N 93°23′08″W
- Translator: 106.3 K292GU (Waseca)

Links
- Public license information: Public file; LMS
- Webcast: Listen live
- Website: thefanowatonna.com

KFOW (1170 AM) is a commercial radio station licensed to Waseca, Minnesota, United States, and serving South Central Minnesota. Owned by the Linder Radio Group, it broadcasts a sports format as "The Fan Owatonna", carrying the programming of KFXN-FM in Minneapolis. Studios are located on Cedardale Drive in Owatonna, Minnesota.

Programming is also heard on low-power FM translator K292GU at 106.3 MHz.

== History ==
On December 22, 1971, the station signed on the air as KOWO. Originally it was a daytimer, powered at 1,000 watts and required to go off the air at night. In later years, it increased its power and added limited nighttime service.

On October 7, 2020, KFOW dropped its classic hits format and began stunting with "Tie Me Kangaroo Down, Sport" by Rolf Harris, a common practice on stations owned by Linder when switching formats. On October 12, KFOW debuted a new talk radio format. As part of the flip, the station affiliated with Fox News Radio.

On May 1, 2023 KFOW changed their format from talk to sports, branded as "The Fan Owatonna".
