= Pesky Pants =

Practical joke

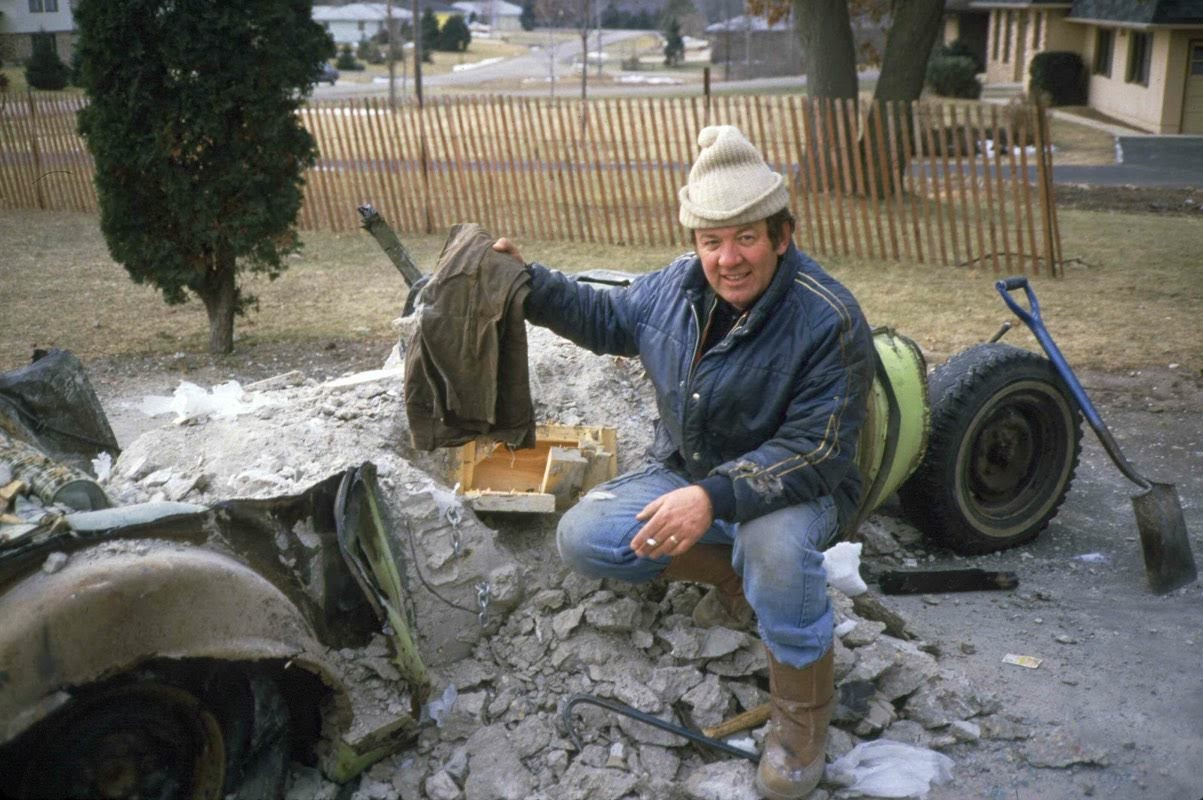
Roy Collette shows the trousers recovered from his Christmas present

The Pesky Pants prank was an ongoing practical joke between 1965 and 1989. Two brothers-in-law took turns giving each other the same pair of trousers as a Christmas present with the packaging becoming more elaborate each year. The prank ended in 1989 with the accidental destruction of the pants.

== Origin ==
The pants, made of moleskin, were originally given to Larry Kunkel by his mother in 1964. Kunkel disliked the pants because the material became uncomfortably stiff in the cold Minnesota winters. Rather than throw them away, he regifted them to his brother-in-law, Roy Collette, the following Christmas. Collette didn't like them either so he waited until the following year and gave them back. For the next couple years, the pants were traded back and forth with traditional wrapping.

== Escalation & gentleman's agreement ==
After several years, Collette took the additional step of twisting the pants tightly and stuffing them into a tube to conceal the nature of the present. Kunkel retaliated by compressing them into a small cube approximately seven inches square and wrapping it with wire.

As the packaging became more elaborate, the goal shifted to making the gift harder for the recipient to open and recover the pants.

An informal agreement existed that only “legal and moral” methods of wrapping were permitted and expenses were kept to a minimum by using junk parts and donated supplies. They also agreed to end the tradition if the pants were destroyed or became unwearable.

== Double-crosses ==
On two occasions, the men agreed to end the tradition early. In 1984, they planned to mount the trousers in a glass frame and present them back to Kunkel's mother Ethel Kunkel. Collette had the trousers professionally cleaned and pressed and delivered them to Kunkel for framing. Kunkel instead returned the pants to Collette in a 1974 Chevrolet Camaro filled with concrete.

Again, in 1987 they agreed to end the saga, this time by destroying the pants with media present. They arranged an event where the pants would be secured between their vehicles and torn in two. Kunkel managed to sabotage the rope and made off with the trousers intact. They were returned to Collette the following year.

== List of gift years ==
Year	Description	Recipient	
1964	Original gift to Kunkel from his mother	Kunkel	
1965	Regift	Collette	
1966-1972	Regifting continues	alternating	
1973	Twisted and rolled into three-foot 1-inch tube.	Kunkel	
1974	Compressed to seven-inch wire-wrapped cube.	Collette	
1975	2-foot crate full of stones and banded with steel	Kunkel	
1976	Double-pane bullet-proof glass frame.	Collette	
1977	5 gallon bucket of concrete.	Kunkel	
1978		None	
1979	Steel Ash-tray 225lbs	Collette	
1980	Steel office safe. Welded door. Dial removed	Kunkel	
1981	1974 AMC Gremlin (crushed)	Collette	The pants were contained in a steel cylinder in the glove compartment
1982	Industrial truck tire. Fused rim. Filled internally with 3 tons of concrete	Kunkel	Concrete filled tire
1983	Rocket ship. 17.5' tall. 5' diameter. 6 tons of concrete	Collette	Six-ton steel and concrete rocket (non-functional)
1984	1974 Camaro filled with concrete	Collette	Extracting the pants from a block of concrete poured into a junked car
1985	4 ton Rubik's Cube (non-functional) Kiln-dried, reinforced concrete core surrounded by lumber	Kunkel	A four-ton concrete and wood rubiks cube (non-functional)
1986	Station-wagon car. Filled with electric generators welded into steel mass	Collette	A junk station wagon filled with hundreds of welded generators
1987	Agreement to destroy. The men agreed to destroy the pants and end the tradition. The pants were tied between two SUVs driven by them. Kunkel managed to sabotage Collette's rope and made off with the trousers intact.	Kunkel	Moleskin Pants Prepared for Destruction
1988	Concrete filled cement truck mixer drum	Collette	Roy Collette and Larry Kunkel pose with a reporter in front of Collette's Christmas present
1989	Pants destroyed (Delivered in brass urn)	Kunkel	Ash remains of pants

== Destruction ==
In 1989 Collette intended to encase the pants in 10,000 pounds of poured molten glass. During the pouring process, the pants were to be protected by an insulated container. However, the container fractured allowing the pants to burn. The ashes were deposited into a brass urn and given to Kunkel ending the tradition.

== Name and media coverage ==
The story was first reported in the Owatonna People's Press in a story that used the name 'Pesky Pants'.

In subsequent years, the prank was covered by many newspapers including New York Times and Chicago Tribune, radio programs and TV news.

On 9 October 1988 the two appeared on Incredible Sunday.
