= KNSG (FM) =

- Marshall, Minnesota; United States
- Frequency: 107.5 MHz
- Branding: 107.5 The Fan

Programming
- Format: Sports
- Affiliations: 100.3 KFAN (KFXN); Fox Sports Radio

Ownership
- Owner: Linder Radio Group; (Subarctic Media, LLC)
- Sister stations: KARL, KARZ, KKCK, KMHL

History
- First air date: July 7, 1985 (as KBJJ)
- Former call signs: KUXB (1984–1985, CP); KBJJ (1985–1997); KARZ (1997–2017)

Technical information
- Licensing authority: FCC
- Facility ID: 51524
- Class: C3
- ERP: 15,000 watts
- HAAT: 131 meters
- Transmitter coordinates: 44°19′32″N 95°52′19″W

Links
- Public license information: Public file; LMS
- Webcast: Listen Live
- Website: KNSG Online

KNSG (107.5 FM, "107.5 The Fan") is a radio station broadcasting a sports format serving Marshall, Minnesota. The station is currently owned by Linder Radio Group.

== History ==
The 107.5 FM frequency first signed on as KBJJ on July 7, 1985. It carried a country music format. In 1997, the station was purchased by KMHL/KKCK (Linder Radio Group). Following the purchase, the call letters were changed to KARZ on March 12, 1997. The format was subsequently flipped from country to classic rock.

On October 16, 2017, 107.5 FM and 94.7 FM swapped their call letters: 94.7 FM changed their call letters to KARZ and 107.5 FM changed their call letters to KNSG. 94.7 FM rebranded their classic hits format with the KARZ call letters.

On October 30, 2017, KNSG changed their format from rock to sports, branded as "The Fan".
