= Kerry Freedman =

Kerry Freedman is a Professor of Art and Design Education at Northern Illinois University and Coordinator of Doctoral Programs in the College of Visual and Performing Arts. She is also a past Head of the Art + Design Education Division. Professor Freedman's research focuses on questions concerning the relationship of curriculum to art, culture, and technology. She has provided significant leadership to the field through her various service roles and publications. Freedman's service roles include, but are not limited to: Senior Editor of Studies in Art Education, the research journal of the National Art Education Association, and World Councilor of the International Society for Education through Art, a UNESCO affiliate. She was the co-Chair of the Art Education Research Institute.

Freedman is an active researcher with nine books, over 120 published articles and book chapters, and her work has been translated into multiple languages. Freedman has done over 200 national and international presentations. She has been a Fulbright Scholar and Visiting Professor at several universities, including Harvard University, Cambridge University, University of Melbourne, University of Barcelona, and University of Sao Paulo.

The art education paradigm shift to VCAE (Visual Culture Art Education) has been greatly influenced by her work. Freedman's scholarship has significantly influenced the shift in art education toward visual culture. Rather than advocating for a single, standardized method or acronym-driven model (such as VCAE), her work—most notably Teaching Visual Culture: Curriculum, Aesthetics, and the Social Life of Art (2003; 2nd ed. 2025) argues for a diversity of approaches to the inclusion of a wide range of visual culture in curriculum. Drawing on social, cognitive, material, and aesthetic perspectives, she emphasizes flexible, context-responsive teaching that moves beyond a narrow focus on traditional fine art and encourages students to become active creators rather than passive consumers of visual culture. Recently, Kerry Freedman was an editor for the curriculum volume of The International Encyclopedia of Art & Design Education, the first art and design education encyclopedia to be published.

Recently, she has particularly focused on inquiries into student learning through engagement with visual culture. She has also co-authored a book with Richard Siegesmund for Routledge on visual research methods and investigating AI in art and design education.

== Education ==
Kerry Freedman obtained her Bachelor of Fine Arts and master's degrees in Art Education from the University of Illinois, Champaign-Urbana. Her Ph.D. in Curriculum and Instruction-Art Education with minors in Art (Computer Graphics), and Psychology was granted by the University of Wisconsin–Madison.

== Career ==
After teaching K-12 art, Freedman's higher education career began as a professor at the University of Minnesota from 1985–2000. Currently, she is a professor a senior graduate faculty of Art and Design Education at Northern Illinois University. While at Northern Illinois University, Freedman was elected as a Distinguished Fellow of the National Art Education Association (NAEA) in 2000, received the 2006 NAEA Higher Art Educator of the year, and the 2014 Higher Art Educator of the Year by the Illinois Art Education Association (IAEA). She has also received the 2026 Eisner Lifetime Achievement Award (NAEA), the first (2025) Art Education Research Institute Leadership Award, the 2024 Distinguished Faculty Award (NIU), the 1998 Leon Jackman Award (the Australian national award for distinguished research in art education), the 2019 Ziegfeld Award, the 2018 Lowenfeld Award, the 2012 Manual Barkan Award (NAEA), and the 2019 United States Society for Education through Art Award among others.

Freedman has worked in over twenty-five countries. She has also supported the arts through several PBS Kids publications that emphasized the importance of art in child development, self-expression, and developing connections.

== Recent Examples of Publications ==
=== Books ===
Teaching Visual Culture: Curriculum, Aesthetics, and the Social Life of Art (2nd Ed.)

- by Kerry Freedman (Author)

Curriculum, Culture, and Art Education: Comparative Perspective (2nd Ed.)

- by Kerry Freedman (Editor), Fernando Hernandez-Hernandez (Editor)

Visual Methods of Inquiry: Images as Research

- by Kerry Freedman (Author), Richard Siegesmund (Author)

The International Encyclopedia of Art & Design Education

- by John Baldacchino (Editor), Kerry Freedman (Editor), Emese Hall (Editor), and Nigel Meager (Editor)

Teaching Visual Culture: Curriculum, Aesthetics, and the Social Life of Art

- by Kerry Freedman (Author)

Looking Back: Fifty Years of Studies in Art Education

- by Kerry Freedman (Editor)

Curriculum, Culture and Art Education: Comparative Perspective (Suny Series, Innovations in Curriculum)

- by Kerry Freedman (Editor), Fernando Hernandez (Editor)

Postmodern Art Education: An Approach to Curriculum

- by A. Efland (Editor), Kerry Freedman (Editor), Patricia Stuhr (Author)

=== Book chapters - Examples ===
Visual culture and visual literacy. The International Encyclopedia of Art and Design Education, Vol. 2 of 3 (Curriculum).

- by Kerry Freedman

Social justice in art education: An example from Africa's last colony. The International Encyclopedia of Art and Design Education, Vol. 2 of 3 (Curriculum).

- by Perez-Martin, F., & Freedman, K.

Viewing comics as education through art. In D. Seelow (Ed.), Leaping tall buildings with comics: Pedagogy and practice.

- by Kerry Freedman

Interculturalism now: How visual culture has changed formal and informal learning. In P. Burnard, E. Mackinlay, & K. Powell (Eds.) The international handbook of intercultural arts research.

- by Kerry Freedman

Becoming a student of art: How institutional change can support contemporary practice. In K. Hatton (Ed.), Towards an inclusive arts education.

- by Kerry Freedman

Learning as a condition of creativity: The relationship between knowing and making art. In E. Zimmerman & F. Bastos (Eds.), Creativity in art education.

- by Kerry Freedman

Research as social action: The research process in art education. In K. Miraglia & C. Smilan (Eds.), Inquiry in action: Paradigms, methodologies and perspectives in art education research.

- by Kerry Freedman

The art of gaming: Knowledge construction in visual culture learning communities. In Venkatesh, V., Castro, J. C., Lewis, J. E., & Wallin, J. (Eds.), Educational, behavioral, and psychological considerations in niche online Communities.

- by Kerry Freedman

Social perspectives of art education in the US. In Bering, K., Niechoff, R. Pauls, K., & Hölscher, S. (Eds.), Visual learning: Positionen im internationalen Vergleich.

- by Kerry Freedman

Assessment of visual knowledge and communication in art education. In A. Karpati & E. Gaul (Eds.), From child art to visual culture of youth.

- by Kerry Freedman

=== Article - Examples ===
The physics of art education: New materialism, AI and the tacit knowledge of visual culture

- by Kerry Freedman

Mapping research with a systematic review: The example of social and emotional learning in art education

- by Freedman, K., Cornwall, J., Carpenter, B.S., Castro, J.C.

Art education in desperate times: What will change and what will not?

- by Kerry Freedman

The story of Vizcult: How a grassroots idea influenced art education.

- by Hicks, L. & Freedman, K.

Collaboration in visual culture learning communities: Towards a synergy of individual and collective creative practice,

- by Karpati, A., Freedman, K., Kallio-Tavin, M. Heijnen, E. & Castro, J. C.

Cultural literacies approach.

- by Kerry Freedman

Visual culture learning communities: How and what students come to know in informal art groups.

- by Freedman, K., Heijnen, E., Kallio-Tavin, M., Karpati, A., & Papp, L.

Leadership in art education: Taking action in schools and communities.

- by Kerry Freedman

Rethinking creativity: A definition to support contemporary practice.

- by Kerry Freedman

Art making/trouble making: Creativity, policy, and leadership in art education.

- by Kerry Freedman
