= KMKO-FM =

Radio station in Lake Crystal, Minnesota

Coordinates: 44°03′06″N 94°18′00″W

- Lake Crystal, Minnesota; United States
- Broadcast area: Mankato, Minnesota
- Frequency: 95.7 MHz
- Branding: Rock 95

Programming
- Format: Active rock
- Affiliations: Westwood One

Ownership
- Owner: Connoisseur Media; (Alpha 3E Licensee LLC)
- Sister stations: KEEZ-FM, KYSM-FM, KRBI-FM

History
- First air date: September 29, 2005 (as KQYK)
- Former call signs: KQYK (2005–2012)
- Call sign meaning: ManKatO

Technical information
- Licensing authority: FCC
- Facility ID: 164294
- Class: A
- ERP: 6,000 watts
- HAAT: 100 m (328 ft)
- Translator: 101.7 K269EC (Mankato)

Links
- Public license information: Public file; LMS
- Webcast: Listen Live
- Website: mankatosrock.com

KMKO-FM (95.7 MHz) is an American radio station licensed to serve the community of Lake Crystal, Minnesota, United States, the station serves the Mankato area and the Minnesota River Valley. The station airs an active rock format.

The station is rebroadcast in Mankato on translator K269EC 101.7 FM, which provides a stronger signal in the downtown area.

== History ==
The station went on the air as KQYK on September 29, 2005, with a country format as "The Eagle". On September 26, 2007, the station flipped to active rock as "95.7 The Blaze," with a format and logo similar to that of sister station KIBZ in Lincoln, Nebraska. On February 1, 2012, KQYK changed their call sign to KMKO-FM. On February 20, 2012, at 11am, KMKO-FM switched to a news/talk format, as Fake It by Seether faded into The Jim Rome Show. The station flipped back to Active Rock as "95-7 The Rock Station" on December 6, 2012.

As of 2018, KMKO-FM has rebranded as “Rock 95” with no change in format.

In May 2024, Alpha Media let go most on-air staffers in their Mankato cluster, which includes KMKO, as part of nationwide cuts. The following month, KMKO began airing Westwood One's "Rock 2.0" format.

In May 2025, Connoisseur Media announced its intent to acquire Alpha Media. The FCC approved the sale on August 13, 2025, and the sale was consummated on September 4.
