= KTOE =

- Mankato, Minnesota; United States
- Broadcast area: Mankato, Minnesota
- Frequency: 1420 kHz
- Branding: 1420 AM/98.7 FM KTOE

Programming
- Format: Commercial; News/Talk
- Affiliations: ABC News Radio; Premiere Networks; Westwood One; Minnesota Twins

Ownership
- Owner: Linder Radio Group; (Subarctic Media, LLC)
- Sister stations: KATO-FM, KDOG, KXAC, KXLP, KFSP

History
- First air date: 1950
- Call sign meaning: ManKaTOE

Technical information
- Licensing authority: FCC
- Facility ID: 42899
- Class: B
- Power: 5,000 watts
- Transmitter coordinates: 44°10′6″N 93°54′37″W
- Translator: 98.7 K254DT (Mankato)

Links
- Public license information: Public file; LMS
- Webcast: Listen Live
- Website: ktoe.com

KTOE (1420 AM) is a radio station licensed to Mankato, Minnesota and serving the Mankato area and the Minnesota River Valley. The 1420 AM frequency went on the air in 1950, airing a news/talk format. The station simulcasts via one FM translator on 98.7 FM. Both stations are licensed to Mankato. The station is operated by Linder Radio Group a.k.a. Subarctic Medial LLC. KTOE partners with the Blue Earth County Historical Society to produce the podcast Surrounded by History, which focuses on local events and figures.

KTOE is the broadcast home for Minnesota State University Division I Hockey and carries play-by-play coverage of the Minnesota Twins.

== History ==
KTOE went on air in 1950 as a full service AC station and was once an affiliate of American Top 40. The station's call letters are a play on its city of license, Mankato, which is pronounced Man-kay-toe.

In the late 1990s and early 2000s, radio personality Hal Hoover worked at KTOE before moving on to work at several major stations in the Twin Cities and Duluth areas.
