= KFSP =

- Mankato, Minnesota; United States
- Frequency: 1230 kHz
- Branding: The Fan

Programming
- Format: Sports
- Affiliations: KFXN-FM; Fox Sports Radio; Minnesota Vikings

Ownership
- Owner: Linder Radio Group; (Subarctic Media, LLC)
- Sister stations: KATO-FM, KXLP, KDOG, KXAC, KTOE

History
- First air date: 1938; 88 years ago (as KYSM)
- Former call signs: KYSM (1938–2014)

Technical information
- Licensing authority: FCC
- Facility ID: 20386
- Class: C
- Power: 1,000 watts
- Transmitter coordinates: 44°10′6″N 93°54′39″W
- Translators: 103.1 K276EH (Mankato); 106.3 K292HI (Mankato)

Links
- Public license information: Public file; LMS
- Webcast: Listen Live
- Website: thefanmankato.com

- See also KFAN Sports Radio Network

KFSP (1230 AM) is a radio station licensed to Mankato, Minnesota and serving the greater Mankato area and the Minnesota River Valley with a sports format. The station is an affiliate of the regional KFAN Sports Radio Network and Fox Sports Radio. Founded in 1938 as KYSM, KFSP is the oldest radio station in Mankato.

The station is owned by Linder Radio Group. It was formerly owned by Clear Channel Communications, which sold its Mankato stations — KYSM, KYSM-FM, and KXLP — to Three Eagles Communications following Clear Channel's 2006 privatization. In September 2007, Three Eagles agreed to sell KYSM and KXLP to Linder Radio Group, a.k.a. Minnesota Valley Broadcasting Co. Linder currently owns KDOG, KTOE, KXAC, KATO-FM and KXLP in the Mankato market.

== History ==
Plans for the station began as early as 1935, with a deposition hearing ordered by the Federal Communications Commission. The station first signed on the air in 1938 under the call sign KYSM. It was constructed by the F.B. Clements Company, featured two studios, and utilized a 281-foot radiator tower. KYSM initially broadcast from 6 a.m. to 1 a.m. with 250 watts of daytime power and 100 watts at night. KYSM began as an NBC AM-radio affiliate but later switched to the Mutual Broadcasting System in 1983.

KYSM was a Top 40 station in the 1960s, full service MOR station during the 1970s and 1980s. The station aired a satellite-fed oldies format until 1995, when it flipped to a satellite-fed adult standards format.

== Programming ==
The station broadcasts games for local and regional teams, including Minnesota Vikings Football, Minnesota State University-Mankato Football and Basketball, and Mankato MoonDogs Baseball. They also cover Mankato Loyola Crusader Sports.

To improve the signal strength and coverage area in Mankato, the station's FM translator, K276EH (103.1 MHz), completed a significant move to an antenna higher on its existing tower in May 2024. This technical upgrade helps the AM signal reach listeners more clearly through the FM dial.
