= KSDJ =

- Brookings, South Dakota; United States
- Frequency: 90.7 MHz
- Branding: New Rock 90.7

Programming
- Format: College; Modern rock

Ownership
- Owner: South Dakota State University

History
- First air date: May 14, 1993

Technical information
- Licensing authority: FCC
- Facility ID: 61073
- Class: A
- ERP: 1,000 watts
- HAAT: 38 meters (125 feet)
- Transmitter coordinates: 44°19′01″N 96°47′02″W

Links
- Public license information: Public file; LMS
- Webcast: Listen Live
- Website: http://www.ksdjradio.com

KSDJ (90.7 FM, "New Rock 90.7") is a radio station licensed to serve Brookings, South Dakota. The station is owned by South Dakota State University. It airs an Alternative rock music format.

The station was assigned the KSDJ call letters by the Federal Communications Commission on May 14, 1993.

== History of call letters ==
The call letters KSDJ were previously assigned to an AM station in San Diego, California. It began broadcasting in 1946 and was owned by the San Diego Daily Journal newspaper.
