= KYSM-FM =

Radio station in Mankato, Minnesota

Coordinates: 44.172°N 94.040°W

- Mankato, Minnesota; United States
- Broadcast area: Mankato, Minnesota
- Frequency: 103.5 MHz
- Branding: Country 103.5

Programming
- Format: Country

Ownership
- Owner: Connoisseur Media; (Alpha 3E Licensee LLC)
- Sister stations: KMKO-FM, KEEZ-FM, KRBI-FM

History
- First air date: January 31, 1948; 78 years ago

Technical information
- Licensing authority: FCC
- Facility ID: 20400
- Class: C1
- ERP: 100,000 watts
- HAAT: 165 m (541 ft)

Links
- Public license information: Public file; LMS
- Webcast: Listen live
- Website: www.1035kysm.com

KYSM-FM (103.5 MHz, "Country 103.5") is an American radio station licensed to Mankato and serving the Minnesota River Valley. The station currently airs a country music format.

== History ==
KYSM-FM first went on the air January 31, 1948, on 103.5 MHz. John F. Meagher was general manager of the station and its sister station, KYSM.

KYSM-FM was purchased by Three Eagles Communications from its previous owner, Clear Channel Communications in August 2007, and then by Digity, LLC on September 12, 2014. Sister stations include KEEZ, KRBI-FM and KMKO-FM.

In May 2024, most on-air staffers in Alpha Media's Mankato cluster, including those on KYSM, were let go as part of a nationwide round of cuts by Alpha. Other on-air staff that were retained were relegated to off-air roles, and the station went jockless. The following month, KYSM began airing programming from Westwood One's "Mainstream Country" format.

In May 2025, Connoisseur Media announced its intent to acquire Alpha Media. The FCC approved the sale on August 13, 2025, and the sale was consummated on September 4.
