= KARZ (FM) =

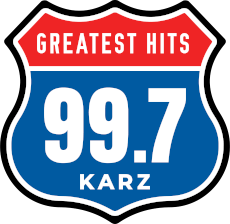
- Marshall, Minnesota; United States
- Broadcast area: Marshall-Brookings-Sioux Falls
- Frequency: 99.7 MHz
- Branding: 99.7 KARZ (pronounced as "Cars")

Programming
- Format: Classic hits
- Affiliations: ABC News Radio

Ownership
- Owner: Linder Radio Group; (Subarctic Media, LLC)
- Sister stations: KARL; KKCK; KMHL; KNSG

History
- First air date: 1975 (as KMHL-FM at 100.1)
- Former call signs: KMHL-FM (1975–1982); KKCK (1982–2019)
- Former frequencies: 100.1 MHz (1975–1988)

Technical information
- Licensing authority: FCC
- Facility ID: 35127
- Class: C1
- ERP: 100,000 watts
- HAAT: 282 meters (925 ft)
- Transmitter coordinates: 44°16′56″N 96°19′5″W
- Translator: 103.3 K277AI (Russell/Marshall]])

Links
- Public license information: Public file; LMS
- Webcast: Listen live
- Website: www.marshallradio.net/karz

KARZ (99.7 FM) is a radio station broadcasting a classic hits format licensed to serve Marshall, Minnesota. The station is owned by Linder Radio Group and the signal reaches most of southwestern Minnesota, eastern South Dakota and northwestern Iowa including Marshall, Brookings, Sioux Falls, Watertown, Willmar, Worthington and Spirit Lake.

KARZ also rebroadcasts on FM translator K277AI 103.3 FM in Russell/Marshall.

== History ==
=== First two decades of KARZ as a rock format on 107.5 ===
KBJJ changed its call letters to KARZ, and switched from country to classic rock in 1997 following being purchased by KMHL/KKCK. 107.5 KARZ later segued into a mainstream rock format around 2000.

On October 16, 2017, 94.7 FM and 107.5 FM swapped call letters: 94.7 FM changed their call letters to KARZ and 107.5 FM changed their call letters to KNSG. 107.5 FM flipped from mainstream rock to sports with KFAN 100.3 (KFXN) programming, and 94.7 FM rebranded their classic hits format to the KARZ call letters.

=== Heritage CHR/Top 40 99.7 KKCK ===
99.7 first signed on in 1975 as KMHL-FM (100.1) with a country music format, before switching to Top 40 (CHR) in the 1982. KKCK debuted automated with TM Programming's "Stereo Rock" Top 40 format briefly, then converted to fully local programming in the mid-1980s. After the call letter change to KKCK in 1982, the station changed its slogan to "KK100," also known as "Double K 100." In 1988, it adopted "FM 100 KKCK" as its slogan after upgrading from 3,000 watts at 100.1 FM to 100,000 watts at 99.7 FM. The station repositioned as "99-7 KKCK" with the "Always A Better Music Mix" slogan in 1992. The station had significant listenership in the Sioux Falls, South Dakota market during the 1990s, despite its transmitter tower being located over 50 miles away, as it was the de facto Top 40/CHR for Sioux Falls until KKLS-FM flipped to "Hot 104.7" in 1997. While KKCK continues to be a minor factor in the Sioux Falls market, the station primarily focuses on Marshall, Minnesota, the surrounding southwestern Minnesota region, and the nearby Brookings, South Dakota area.

Unlike most Top 40/CHR formatted stations, KKCK has flexibility to introduce new music to listeners (including, but not limited to, Top 40 (CHR), Rhythmic, Dance Radio/EDM, and Mainstream Urban) that includes genres such as indie, alternative, modern rock/active rock, and Hot AC/Modern AC including those genres' new music in its music mix. The station also aired The Shag, a long running alternative rock program, on Sunday nights. It shares a local news department with KMHL, and gets national news from ABC. A large amount of the broadcasting day is live, KKCK is regarded as a "heritage" Top 40/CHR station, thanks in part to its longevity in the format. KKCK also benefits from the long reach of its 99.7 FM signal, which has local coverage in Marshall, Minnesota and Brookings, South Dakota, rimshot coverage of Madison, South Dakota and Sioux Falls, South Dakota, and can be regularly received as far north as Watertown, South Dakota and Willmar, Minnesota (north of Redwood Falls), and as far south as Canton, South Dakota (south of Sioux Falls), and Spirit Lake, Iowa (south of Worthington).

A winter storm damaged KKCK's transmitter in December 2015, and the station has been broadcasting at reduced power since. In May 2017, KKCK's programming moved to 94.7 KNSG while the transmitter is being rebuilt. KKCK returned to full power at 99.7 FM around November 2017, and classic hits resuming at 94.7 KNSG.

=== Frequency swap with 94.7 KARZ ===
On April 3, 2019, the heritage Top 40/CHR formatted KKCK moved to the more eastern signal of the Springfield licensed 94.7 FM, with a fringe signal coverage of Mankato, swapping frequencies with classic hits-formatted KARZ, which moved to the larger coverage area, and the more western signal, of 99.7 FM Marshall. KARZ plays many of the songs now included in the classic hits format during KKCK's early years as a Top 40/CHR, and KKCK adopted the "Today's Hit Music" slogan with no format changes.

KKCK's frequency swap from 99.7 FM to 94.7 FM leaves Brookings, South Dakota without a local Top 40/CHR station, however it is within rimshot coverage of Sioux Falls Top 40/CHR stations KKLS-FM "Hot 104.7" and KQSF "Q95.7". Local college radio station KSDJ "New Rock 90.7" does play modern rock/alternative music included in KKCK's rock-leaning CHR/Top 40 ("Rock 40") format.
