= KEMJ =

- St. James, Minnesota; United States
- Broadcast area: St. James/Fairmont, Minnesota
- Frequency: 101.5 MHz
- Branding: 101-5 The Emoji

Programming
- Format: Hot adult contemporary

Ownership
- Owner: Linder Radio Group; (Subarctic Media, LLC)
- Sister stations: KFMC-FM, KSUM

History
- First air date: 1981 (as KKKA)
- Former call signs: KKKA (1981–1983); KXAX (1983–1997); KRRW (1997–2020)
- Former frequencies: 104.9 MHz
- Call sign meaning: EMoJi

Technical information
- Licensing authority: FCC
- Facility ID: 57428
- Class: C3
- ERP: 14,000 watts
- HAAT: 136 metres (446 ft)
- Transmitter coordinates: 43.874°N 94.600°W

Links
- Public license information: Public file; LMS
- Webcast: Listen Live
- Website: www.emoji1015.com

KEMJ (101.5 FM, "101-5 The Emoji") is a radio station broadcasting a Hot Adult Contemporary format serving the St. James/Fairmont, Minnesota area. The station is currently owned by Linder Radio Group.

== History ==
=== Early years as KKKA and KXAX ===
The station traces its authorization to a construction permit granted by the Federal Communications Commission on September 2, 1981. FCC call-sign records show that the facility was assigned the call sign KKKA on November 16, 1981, and changed call letters to KXAX on July 6, 1983.

The original permit was for a station on 104.9 MHz with 3,000 watts and an antenna height of 279 feet above average terrain. In 1982, Broadcasting reported that Watonwan County Broadcasting Co. sought to assign the KKKA construction permit to Watonwan Communications for $5,600 plus a 20-percent interest in the buyer. The FCC granted the assignment on November 16, 1982. FCC records show that the station's license to cover was granted on January 25, 1984.

Minnesota Broadcasters Association historical material lists KXAX, St. James, as a July 1983 addition to the state’s FM roster. By the early 1990s, KXAX-FM was listed on 104.9 MHz under Rogers Broadcasting, Inc., with Dick Rogers as president and general manager and Phil Rogers as vice president. The station’s programming was described as adult contemporary during the day and album-oriented rock at night.

=== Move to 101.5 and KRRW ===
By 1996, KXAX had shifted to a modern country format. That year, Broadcasting reported that Rogers Broadcasting sold KXAX and sister station KXAC 100.5 to Minnesota Valley Broadcasting Co. for $800,000. At the time of the sale, KXAX was still listed as operating on 104.9 MHz with 3,000 watts. FCC records show that the assignment to Minnesota Valley Broadcasting was granted on July 31, 1996.

Also in 1996, Rogers Broadcasting filed to move and upgrade KXAX to 101.5 MHz, changing the station’s effective radiated power, antenna, transmitter location and class. FCC application records show that the minor-modification authorization was granted on September 11, 1996, and that the resulting license to cover was granted on July 1, 1997. The station changed call letters from KXAX to KRRW on June 23, 1997.

KRRW remained associated with country programming for more than two decades. In April 2020, Subarctic Media moved the KRRW call sign and "North Star Country" format to the former KHRS 105.9 in Winthrop/New Ulm, while the 101.5 facility changed call letters to KEMJ. NorthPine reported that KEMJ/101.5 was initially simulcasting the classic country service, which included ABC News, the Linder Farm Network and NASCAR.

=== KEMJ and "The Emoji" ===
On May 18, 2020, KEMJ changed from the country simulcast to hot adult contemporary as "101.5 The Emoji". NorthPine reported that the change occurred at 9 a.m. after a weekend stunt loop of "Tie Me Kangaroo Down, Sport", and that the flip ended decades of country programming on the 101.5 facility. NorthPine also reported that KEMJ was owned by Subarctic Media and operated alongside City of Lakes Media's Fairmont stations, which were under related ownership.

FCCInfo lists KEMJ as a licensed commercial Class C3 FM station on 101.5 MHz, licensed to St. James, Minnesota, with an effective radiated power of 14,000 watts and an antenna height above average terrain of 136 meters. In 2025, the FCC granted a transfer of control of KEMJ licensee Subarctic Media, LLC, from J David Linder to Thomas Linder.
