= Manganese, Minnesota =

Manganese
- Ghost town
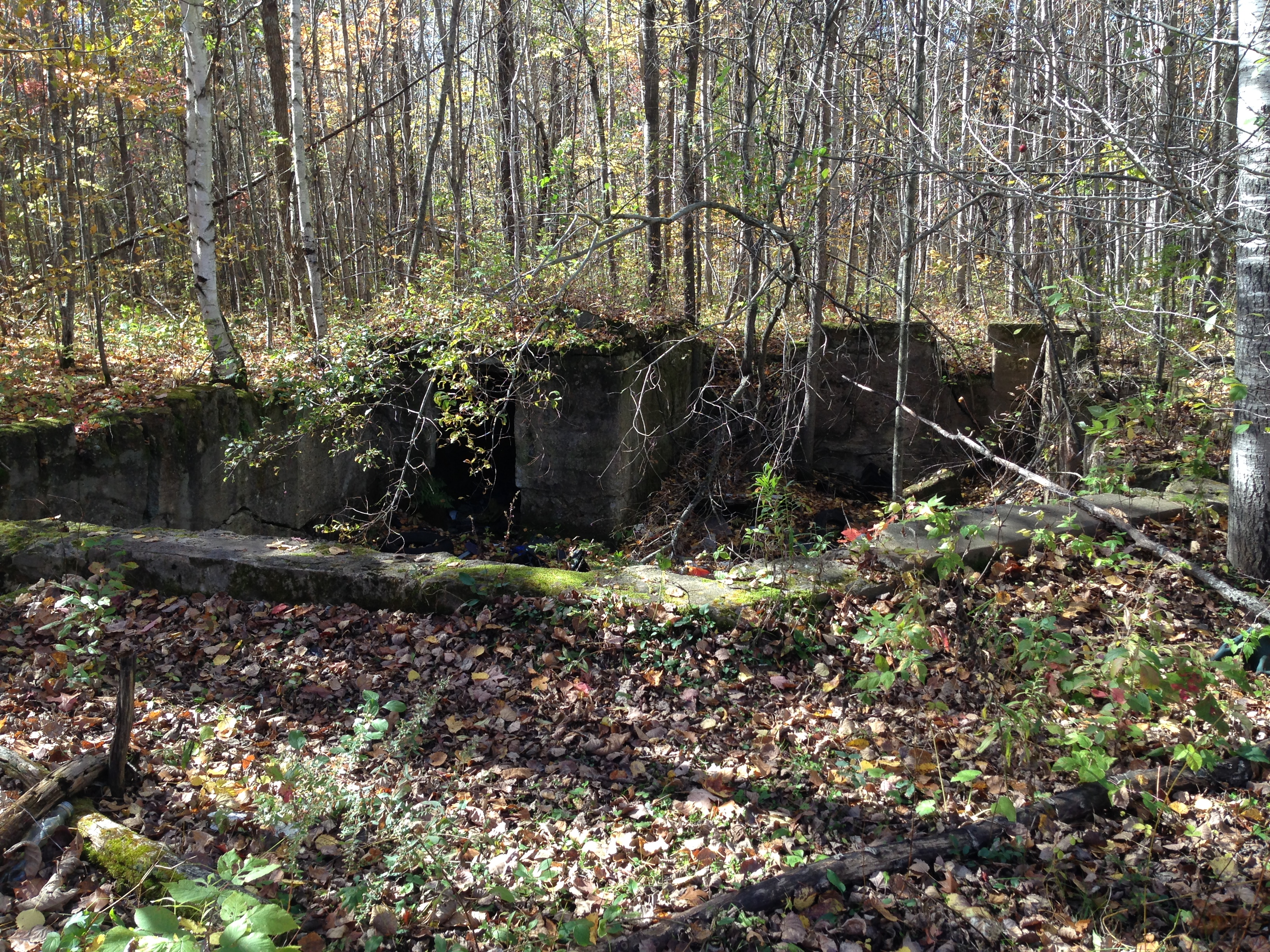
- Ruins and crumbling concrete foundation of the old Fitger Hotel in Manganese, October 2016
- Etymology: Manganese
- Location within Minnesota Location within the United States
- Coordinates: 46°31′39″N 94°00′35″W
- Country: United States
- State: Minnesota
- County: Crow Wing
- Founded: March 13, 1912
- Incorporated: November 10, 1913
- Dissolved: July 17, 1961
- Elevation: 1,250 ft (380 m)
- Time zone: UTC−6 (Central (CST))
  - Summer (DST): UTC−5 (CDT)
- GNIS feature ID: 654881

Manganese is a ghost town and former mining community in the U.S. state of Minnesota that was inhabited between 1912 and 1960. It was built in Crow Wing County on the Cuyuna Iron Range in sections 23 and 28 of Wolford Township, about 2 miles (3 km) north of Trommald, Minnesota. After its formal dissolution, Manganese was absorbed by Wolford Township; the former town site is located between Coles Lake and Flynn Lake. First appearing in the U.S. Census of 1920 with an already dwindling population of 183, the village was abandoned by 1960.

Manganese was one of the last of the Cuyuna Range communities to be established, and was named after the mineral located in abundance near the town. Manganese was an incorporated community, built on land above the Trommald Formation, the main ore-producing unit of the North Range district of the Cuyuna Iron Range, unique due to the amount of manganese in part of the iron formation and ore. The Trommald Formation and adjacent Emily District are the largest resource of manganese in the United States. The community was composed of many immigrants who had fled the natural disasters and social and political upheavals in Europe during the decades before World War I.

Manganese was laid out with three north–south and five east–west streets. Concrete sidewalks and curbing lined the clay streets, which were never paved. At its peak around 1919, Manganese had two hotels, a bank, two grocery stores, a barbershop, a show hall, and a two-room school, and housed a population of nearly 600. After World War I, the population of Manganese went into steady decline as mining operations shut down; along with the quagmire of the clay streets due to spring rains, this led to the community's eventual abandonment and formal dissolution in 1961. The privately owned land started to be resettled in 2017, as the old wooded lots were cleared and redeveloped as primitive campsites.

== History ==
The area around Manganese, and modern-day Crow Wing County, was inhabited in the mid-to-late 1600s by three distinct populations of Native Americans vying for control of the lands that would become the Cuyuna Range. The Arapaho living along the western border of the Great Lakes were quickly displaced by the Dakota and Ojibwe nations; frequent conflicts between the Dakota and Ojibwe eventually resulted in undisputed control of the region by the Ojibwe. In 1855, a treaty between the Ojibwe and the U.S. government was signed by chief Hole in the Day in what was then Minnesota Territory. This treaty secured Ojibwe hunting and fishing rights while ceding land which would become the Cuyuna Range to European-Americans looking to build new settlements in the region. The Minnesota Territorial Legislature enacted the creation of Crow Wing County on May 23, 1857. Minnesota was admitted as the 32nd U.S. state on May 11, 1858, and Deerwood (originally named Withington), was the first Cuyuna Range community, settled in 1871.

The discovery of the Cuyuna Iron Range was an accident, made by the chance observation of a compass needle irregularity in 1895 while surveyor and mining engineer Cuyler Adams was exploring the area with his St. Bernard, named "Una". Adams surmised that a large, underground body of iron ore might be responsible for the discrepancy. Eight years after meticulously mapping these compass deflections, Adams performed test drilling in May 1903 which resulted in the discovery of manganiferous ore near Deerwood. Thirteen years after ore discovery by the Merritt Brothers in 1890 trigged an iron rush to the Mesabi Range, another iron rush began in Minnesota, and new mining communities began to develop along the width and breadth of the "Cuyuna" Iron Range, named by combining the first syllable of Adams' given name and the name of his dog.

=== Establishment and community ===
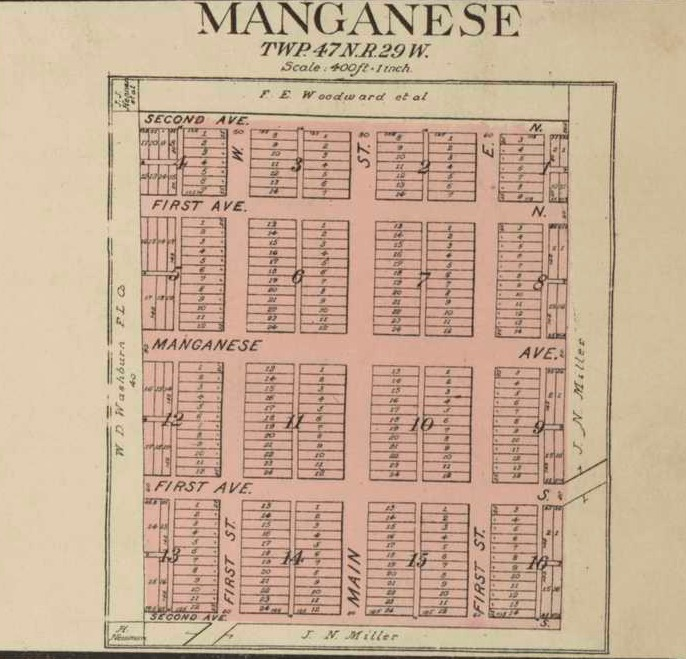
Manganese townsite plat, 1913

Manganese was platted in sections 23 and 28 of Wolford Township by the Duluth Land and Timber Company on February 5, 1911, established on March 13, 1912, and incorporated on November 10, 1913, with 960 acres (390 ha) inside the corporate limits. As a result of the rapid mining development, all of the lots were sold within seven weeks of platting for $100 to $350 each. Manganese was named for the mineral located in abundance nearby. The mines surrounding the community included the Algoma mine, owned by the Onaham Iron Company and founded in 1911; the Gloria and Merrit No. 2 mines, both owned by the Hanna Mining Company and founded in 1916; the Milford Mine, owned by the Cuyuna-Minneapolis Iron Company and founded in 1917, and the Preston mine, owned by Coates and Tweed and founded in 1918. The sixth of the Cuyuna Range communities to be established (after Deerwood, Cuyuna, Crosby, Ironton, and Riverton), the new town was touted as the "Hibbing of the Cuyuna Range". Hibbing, founded in 1893 and by 1915 the largest mining community on the Mesabi Range with a population of 20,000, was at one time called the "Iron Ore Capital of the World."

An official U.S. Post Office opened in 1912 and remained in operation through 1924. In 1914, the town site had a crew of men and teams building streets with concrete sidewalks and curbing (although the clay roads were never paved). The Fitger Brewing Company also built a $10,000, two-story hotel in 1914, complete with a bar and restaurant. By 1919, Manganese had two hotels, a bank, two grocery stores, two butcher shops, a lumber yard, a bakery, a livery stable, a barbershop, a pool room, a show hall, a dog pound, and a two-room school, and housed a population of nearly 600. That same year, the village issued a bond for a $30,000 waterworks project, and the Pastoret Company of Duluth built a 100-foot (30 m) water tower with a 30,000-US-gallon (110,000 L) capacity. Manganese and other Cuyuna Range communities benefited greatly from an unusual situation created by an ad valorem property tax on unmined natural ore, resulting in huge amounts of unforeseen revenue, great expenditures of which were made on public works and improvements.

School teacher Anna Dugan with the Manganese Soo Line depot in background

After the discovery of ore near Deerwood, Adams approached James J. Hill, then president of the Northern Pacific Railway, asking for a discounted rate to haul Cuyuna Range ore to Duluth (the rate from the Mesabi Range, which had richer ore, was one dollar per ton). Hill refused, so Adams went to Thomas Shaughnessy, president of the Canadian Pacific Railway and a competitor of Hill, who readily agreed to build 100 miles (160 km) of railroad with the guarantee to haul ten million tons of ore at sixty-five cents per ton. At the time, the Canadian Pacific controlled the Soo Line Railroad, having secured the railroad's funded debt, and the Soo Line came to furnish rail transportation to Manganese and the surrounding mines. In 1914, the Soo Line Railroad constructed a branch line to Manganese, and began excavation for a 24-by-60-foot (7 m × 18 m) passenger and freight depot with a 300-foot-long (91 m) platform. This branch line was essentially a spur track uncontrolled by train orders: only one train at a time was permitted on the track, with all of the traffic controlled by the Soo Line dispatcher at Iron Hub. Passenger connections with the other Cuyuna Iron Range towns were available three times daily through the operation of buses owned by the Cuyuna Range Transportation Company. It was speculated that Henry Ford once visited Manganese when he was exploring the acquisition of the Algoma mine on behalf of the Ford Motor Company. Ford was never observed, but his private rail car, the Fair Lane, with the familiar Ford oval and the gilded words "Ford Motor Company, Dearborn, Michigan", was seen parked on the siding at Manganese.

The community was composed of many immigrants, including Finns, Croatians, Austrians, Swedes, Irish, Australians, English, Norwegians, Slovenians, and Serbs. Children attended school in Manganese through the eighth grade, attending high school in nearby Crosby, Minnesota. Known then as Independent School District No. 86, the school had indoor plumbing and later its own well, constructed by the Works Progress Administration. Over time, the village of Manganese had three wells, all of which collapsed at some point due to the heavy clay soils.

During late World War I, all of the mines surrounding the community were running at full capacity, furnishing about 90% of the manganese used during the war. By 1920, the combined payrolls of these mines totaled $160,000 (approximately $9.6 million in adjusted 2020 production worker compensation). Seven citizens from Manganese served in the military during World War I, including Harry Hosford, who later survived the Milford mine disaster.

=== Decline ===
After the World War I armistice was signed, the demand for manganiferous ore decreased, and Manganese experienced a sharp drop in population from its peak of nearly 600 in 1919 to 183 in 1920. Many of the remaining residents worked in the Milford mine, which flooded on February 5, 1924, a result of blasting in a drift that extended beneath Foley (now Milford) Lake. Forty-one miners were killed in what was Minnesota's worst mining disaster; only seven, including Hosford, made it to safety. Many Manganese residents were superstitious and convinced that both the town of Manganese, and the Milford mine, were cursed.

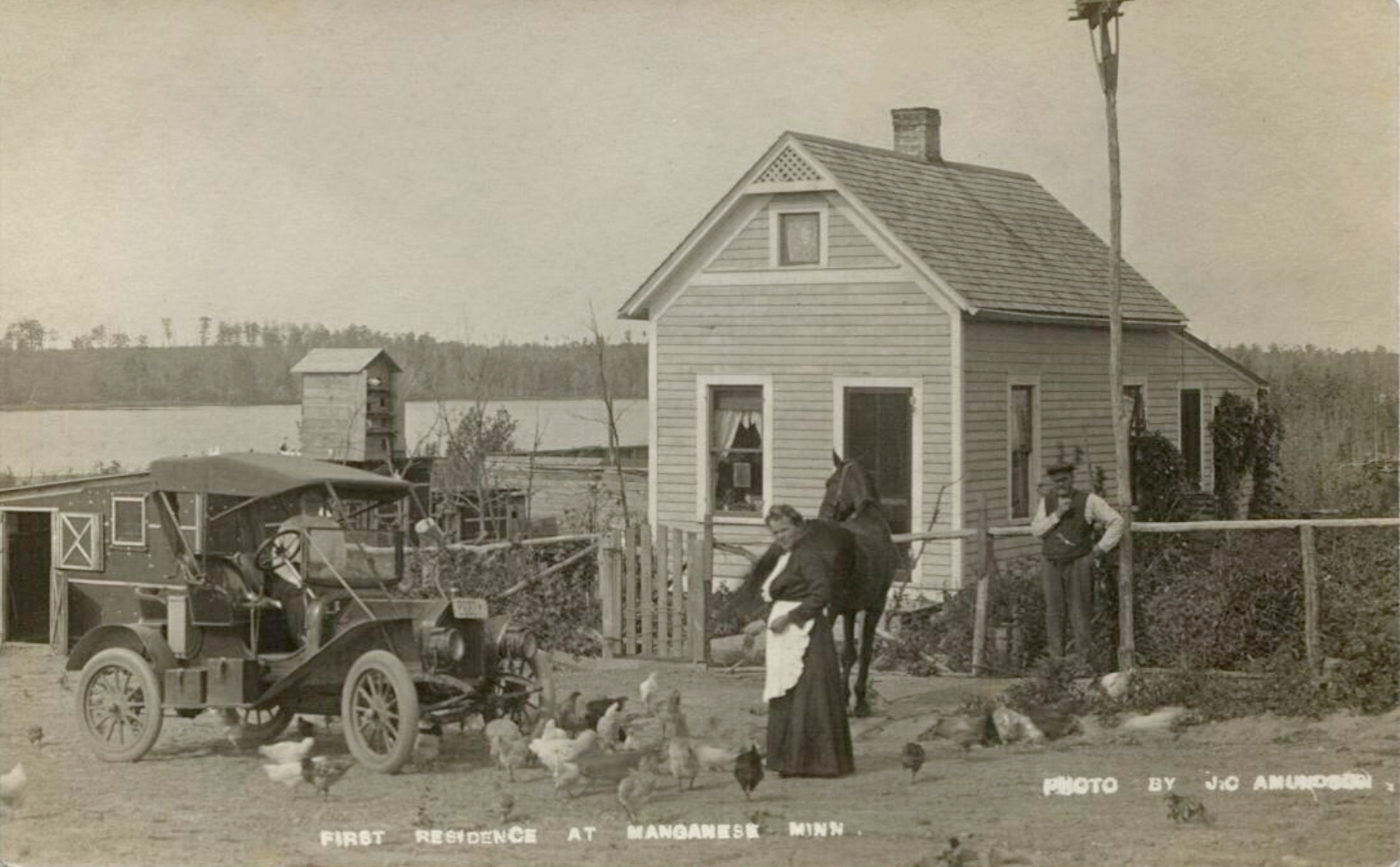
The Iver M. Olson home, first residence in Manganese; by the late 1950s, all the houses in town would be gone

With the advent of the Great Depression, mining operations ceased. The Soo Line tore up the track to Manganese in 1930. The last shipment of ore from the Gloria mine occurred in 1931; the Milford mine closed in 1932, although the Merritt mine continued to produce ore intermittently until 1943, and stockpile shipments from the Algoma mine continued through 1980. Very few photos of Manganese are known to exist. Never a wealthy community, residents had no money for cameras, a luxury item during the Depression.

In 1938, a Wesleyan Methodist Church and Sunday school was founded. Up to four Sunday school classes were offered depending on the ages of the children, and guest pastors would come to conduct services when occasional revival meetings were held. The congregation came from Trommald, Mission, Wolford, and Perry Lake, in addition to Manganese. The church was sold and torn down after World War II when the congregation was no longer able have a pastor appointed. As mining operations began to shut down, little employment was left in the community, and residents gradually started moving their homes out of town, relocating to other communities in the region to find new jobs.

=== Abandonment and later use ===
Historical population
Census	Pop.	Note	%±
1920	183		—
1930	96		−47.5%
1940	62		−35.4%
1950	41		−33.9%
U.S. Decennial Census

Most of the remaining residents moved out around 1955. Structures that were not moved out of the community were torn down. After all of the residents left, the clay roads continued to be maintained, and the street lights remained on until the early 1970s. In 1959, the village of Ironton, one of the creditors for the village of Manganese, petitioned Crow Wing County for the community's dissolution. Einer R. Anderson, then Crow Wing County Auditor, was appointed as its receiver, and creditors of the village of Manganese were given six months to file a claim. Notices sent via registered mail to the last known village officers were refused and returned. Bids were accepted for the sale of the Manganese water tower and the frame building that had housed the village hall, with the condition that all debris be disposed of at the expense of the buyer. The steel water tower, with an estimated weight of 100 short tons (91,000 kg) of scrap metal, was valued at $1,200; however, the sale and salvage of the water tower yielded net proceeds of only $200. Ironically, the surviving Cuyuna Iron Range municipally-owned elevated metal water tanks (in the towns of Crosby, Cuyuna, Deerwood, Ironton, and Trommald) were added to the National Register of Historic Places in 1980. The final hearing regarding the dissolution of Manganese was held on July 17, 1961. Manganese was formally dissolved and absorbed by Wolford Township.

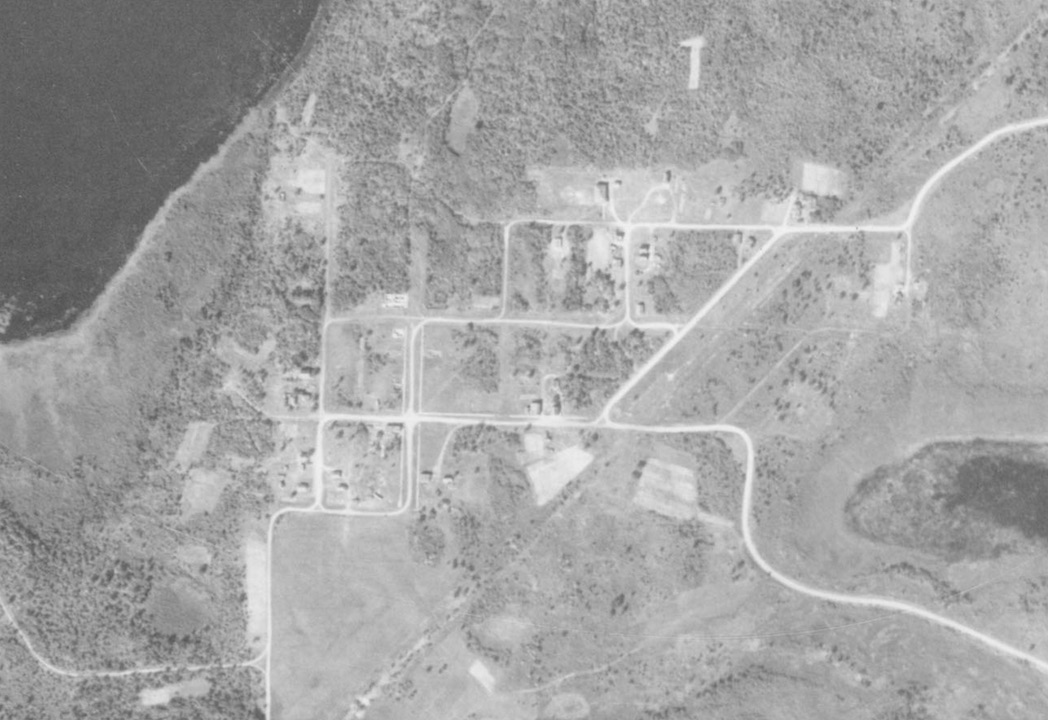
Aerial photo of Manganese in 1939, before its abandonment

After the town was abandoned, only remnants of sidewalks, rubble, building foundations, old tires, plastic, pieces of clothing, beer cans, and other abandoned items remained. Willow, aspen, and other trees covered what was once a land occupied by numerous buildings; roots, shrubs, and grass began to heave and crack the concrete sidewalks and overtake the remaining grid pattern of roads, and the entire town site was consumed by the steady growth of natural vegetation. Most of the remaining structures succumbed to the elements. Old building foundations and basements, covered with graffiti, were engulfed by the brush. In 2003, the majority of the land which comprised the former town site was purchased, and a gate was posted along with a "no trespassing" sign at the southeast entrance to the former town. In 2006, the privately owned land was sold again; limited resettlement began in 2017. Called Manganese Base Camp, the old wooded lots, about 0.3 acres (0.12 ha) each, were being cleared and redeveloped as primitive campsites, without electricity, running water, or waste disposal services. Since then, Base Camp has hosted an annual Manganese Days Festival. The event is open to the public as a way to honor the former village, learn of its history, and explore the old town.

== Geography ==
Manganese lay at an elevation of 1,250 feet (380 m) in Crow Wing County, Minnesota, about 15 miles (24 km) northeast of Brainerd and 91 miles (146 km) west-southwest of Duluth. The nearest cities to Manganese were Trommald, approximately 2 miles (3 km) to the south-southwest, and Wolford, approximately 2 miles (3 km) to the northeast. Manganese was located to the west of Crow Wing County Road 30, about 5 miles (8 km) north of Minnesota State Highway 210 and 3 miles (5 km) west of Minnesota State Highway 6.

Manganese was laid out with three primary north–south streets: First Street East, Main Street, and First Street West. Second Avenue North, First Avenue North, Manganese Avenue, First Avenue South (now Old Manganese Road), and Second Avenue South traversed Manganese from east to west. The Soo Line right of way bisected the community on the east side of Manganese from the northeast to the southwest. First Avenue North extended about 1.9 miles (3.1 km) to the Milford mine.

=== Geology ===
Manganese lay atop the iron-rich Trommald Formation, the main ore-producing unit of the North Range district of the Cuyuna Iron Range.

The Trommald Formation and adjacent Emily District are the largest resource of manganese in the United States. The largest high-grade deposit of manganiferous ore is located about 14 miles (23 km) north of Manganese on a 5-acre (2.0 ha) site at the edge of Emily. Valuable in steel and aluminum production, manganese is also used to make batteries. There is a local push to "scram" the stockpiles of ore found in the old waste rock of the Cuyuna Iron Range. This mining process is significantly less invasive than traditional blasting and crushing, producing iron ore and iron ore concentrates from previously developed waste rock stockpiles, tailings basins, open pit, or underground mines on land not previously affected by mining. However, the processing of some stockpiles would disrupt the Cuyuna Lakes Mountain Bike Trails, which opened in June 2011, and have been economically beneficial to the region after the last manganiferous ore was shipped from the Cuyuna Range in 1984, resurrecting many Cuyuna Range communities that had been on the brink of economic collapse. This potential for ore processing has created debate as to whether mining and mountain biking can coexist. The use of former underground Cuyuna Range mines as a means of compressed-air energy storage has also been investigated by researchers at the University of Minnesota.

=== Climate ===
Manganese was in the Laurentian Mixed Forest Province in the Brainerd Lakes Area of north central Minnesota. The Köppen climate classification is Dfb. Precipitation ranges from about 21 inches (53 cm) annually along the western border of the forest to about 32 inches (81 cm) at its eastern edge. Average annual temperatures are about 34 °F (1 °C) along the northern part of the forest, rising to 40 °F (4 °C) at its southern extreme.

July is the warmest month, when the average high temperature is 80 °F (27 °C) and the average low is 56 °F (13 °C). January is the coldest, with an average high temperature of 20 °F (−7 °C) and average low of 0 °F (−18 °C). The spring rains wreaked havoc on Manganese's clay streets, which was cited as one of the reasons for its abandonment.

== See also ==
- Iron Range
- List of ghost towns in the United States

== Sources ==
- Bergan, Kathleen M.; Lammi, Michelle M. (2015). Iron Range Ghost Locations. Gilbert, Minnesota: Iron Range Historical Society. OCLC 946962834.
- Borchert, John R. (1959). Minnesota's Changing Geography. Minneapolis: University of Minnesota Press. ISBN 978-0-8166-6839-7. Archived from the original on August 10, 2021.
- Cuyuna Country Heritage Preservation Society (2002). Cuyuna Country: A People's History. Vol. II (First ed.). Brainerd, Minnesota: Bang Printing Company. ISBN 978-0-9677450-0-8.
- Hansen, Arvy (1976). Cuy-Una! A Chronicle of the Cuyuna Range. Crosby, Minnesota: Cuyuna Range Bicentennial Committee. ASIN B0006XIW3I.
- Havinghurst, Walter (1958). Vein of Iron: The Pickands-Mather Story. Cleveland and New York: World Publishing Company. ASIN B0007DMAS0. Archived from the original on June 9, 2021.
- Himrod, Anna (c. 1944). Historical Handbook, Crow Wing County Histories. OCLC 313860231.
- Klemic, Harry (1970). Survey of World Iron Resources: Iron Ore Deposits of the United States of America, Puerto Rico, Mexico and Central America. New York: United Nations Department of Economic and Social Affairs. OCLC 105522.
- Lake Superior Iron Ore Association (1952). Lake Superior Iron Ores: Mining Directory and Statistical Record of the Lake Superior Iron Ore District of the United States and Canada (Second ed.). Cleveland: Lake Superior Iron Ore Association. OCLC 1025093.
- Leighton, Hudson (1998). Gazetteer of Minnesota Railroad Towns, 1861–1997. Roseville, Minnesota: Park Genealogical Books. ISBN 978-0-915709-61-8. Archived from the original on June 9, 2021.
- Minnesota Historical Records Survey Project (1940). The Cuyuna Range: A History of a Minnesota Iron Mining District. St. Paul, Minnesota: Works Progress Administration Division of Professional and Service Projects. ASIN B07HV921QQ. Archived from the original on August 10, 2021.
- Morey, G. B. (1990). Geology and Manganese Resources of the Cuyuna Iron Range, East-Central Minnesota (PDF) (Report). St. Paul, Minnesota: Minnesota Geological Survey. ISSN 0544-3105. Archived (PDF) from the original on August 8, 2017.
- Schmidt, Robert Gordon (1963). Geology and Ore Deposits of the Cuyuna North Range Minnesota (PDF) (Report). Washington: Government Printing Office. ISBN 978-1-288-96476-5. Archived (PDF) from the original on May 2, 2019.
- Sutherland, Frederick (2016). The Cuyuna Iron Range: Legacy of a 20th Century Industrial Community (PhD thesis). Houghton, Michigan: Michigan Technological University. doi:10.37099/mtu.dc.etdr/110. S2CID 164100360. ProQuest 1806130715.
- United States, Bureau of the Census (1922). Fourteenth Census of the United States: 1920 (PDF). Vol. III. Washington: Government Printing Office. ISBN 978-1-396-46429-4. Archived (PDF) from the original on September 21, 2013.
- United States, Bureau of the Census (1964). U.S. Census of Population, 1960 (PDF). Vol. I, Pt. 25. Washington: Government Printing Office. ISBN 978-1-390-26083-0. Archived (PDF) from the original on June 9, 2011.
- Upham, Warren (2001). Minnesota Place Names: A Geographical Encyclopedia (Third ed.). St. Paul, Minnesota: Minnesota Historical Society. ISBN 978-0-87351-396-8. Archived from the original on June 9, 2021.
