= National Register of Historic Places listings in Crow Wing County, Minnesota =

Location of Crow Wing County in Minnesota

This is a list of the National Register of Historic Places listings in Crow Wing County, Minnesota. It is intended to be a complete list of the properties and districts on the National Register of Historic Places in Crow Wing County, Minnesota, United States. The locations of National Register properties and districts for which the latitude and longitude coordinates are included below, may be seen in an online map.

There are 37 properties and districts listed on the National Register in the county.

This National Park Service list is complete through NPS recent listings posted August 1, 2025.

== Current listings ==
	Name on the Register	Image	Date listed	Location	City or town	Description
1	Brainerd Public Library	Brainerd Public Library	May 23, 1980 (#80002022)	206 N. 7th St. 46°21′30″N 94°11′56″W	Brainerd	1904 Carnegie library, a well-preserved example of the 65 originally built in Minnesota. Also noted for its prominent Neoclassical architecture.
2	Brainerd Water Tower	Brainerd Water Tower	July 17, 1974 (#74001014)	Washington at 6th St. 46°21′28″N 94°12′01″W	Brainerd	Nation's first municipal water tower built entirely out of concrete, constructed 1918–21; an innovation in water storage and a distinctive regional landmark.
3	Bridge No. 5265-Garrison	Bridge No. 5265-Garrison	June 29, 1998 (#98000681)	U.S. Route 169 near Mille Lacs Lake; 46°17′15″N 93°49′25″W	Garrison	1938 bridge consisting of a modular iron-plate arch and fine stone masonry, one of the finest examples of a style used in many of Minnesota's New Deal bridge projects.
4	H. H. Broach House	H. H. Broach House	May 23, 1980 (#80002037)	30707 Pequot Boulevard; 46°35′53″N 94°19′33″W	Pequot Lakes	Mid-1920s summer estate also known as Shawano House, significant for its impressive rustic architecture of log and stone.
5	A.L. Cole Memorial Building	A.L. Cole Memorial Building	May 26, 2004 (#04000530)	4285 Tower Square; 46°36′13″N 94°18′51″W	Pequot Lakes	1937 municipal hall illustrating the long-lived benefits of New Deal funding, from providing jobs during its construction to serving as a key venue for numerous local events, and generating revenue 1941–1967 as a civic movie theater. Now houses a senior center and museum.
6	Crow Wing County Courthouse and Jail	Crow Wing County Courthouse and Jail	May 23, 1980 (#80002023)	326 Laurel St. 46°21′20″N 94°12′13″W	Brainerd	Long-serving government center, consisting of a 1916 jail/sheriff's residence (now a museum) and a courthouse (built 1919–20) further noted as Crow Wing County's most prominent public building and an exemplary fruit of the City Beautiful movement.
7	Crow Wing State Park	Crow Wing State Park	July 28, 1970 (#70000288)	Off Minnesota Highway 371; 46°16′36″N 94°20′17″W	Baxter vicinity	Long-used site at a key travel junction associated with the Dakota/Ojibwe territorial conflict and the early town of Old Crow Wing, whose abandonment in the 1880s uniquely preserves the succession of the Native American, fur trade, and logging eras. Extends into Cass and Morrison Counties.
8	Cuyuna Village Hall	Cuyuna Village Hall	August 2, 2024 (#100010629)	24945 Minnesota Avenue; 46°31′05″N 93°55′25″W	Cuyuna	Municipal hall established in 1954; Cuyuna's long-serving center of government services and community events. Repurposed from a 1911 bank building, with 1978 and 1987 additions.
9	Deerwood Auditorium	Deerwood Auditorium	November 29, 1995 (#95001376)	27 E. Forest Rd. 46°28′30″N 93°53′59″W	Deerwood	Exemplary multipurpose municipal building funded by the New Deal, built 1935–7 using local split stone. Also noted as Minnesota's largest project by the State Emergency Relief Administration and a longstanding venue for community events.
10	Elevated Metal Water Tank, Crosby	Elevated Metal Water Tank, Crosby	October 22, 1980 (#80002027)	Western side of 1st Ave. E., between 1st and 2nd Sts., N. 46°29′02″N 93°57′03″W	Crosby	Water tower built between 1912 and 1918, one of the few remnants of the extensive civic infrastructure funded by unexpectedly high tax revenue generated by mining properties during the development of the Cuyuna Range. Likely demolished (see talk page).
11	Elevated Metal Water Tank, Cuyuna	Elevated Metal Water Tank, Cuyuna	October 22, 1980 (#80002028)	Northern side of North St. west of Chicago Ave. 46°31′09″N 93°55′21″W	Cuyuna	1912 water tower, one of the few remnants of the extensive civic infrastructure funded by unexpectedly high tax revenue generated by mining properties during the development of the Cuyuna Range.
12	Elevated Metal Water Tank, Deerwood	Elevated Metal Water Tank, Deerwood	October 22, 1980 (#80002029)	211 Maple St. 46°28′32″N 93°53′58″W	Deerwood	1914 water tower, one of the few remnants of the extensive civic infrastructure funded by unexpectedly high tax revenue generated by mining properties during the development of the Cuyuna Range.
13	Elevated Metal Water Tank, Ironton	Elevated Metal Water Tank, Ironton	October 22, 1980 (#80002030)	Southern side of 7th St. west of Viola Ave. 46°28′28″N 93°58′34″W	Ironton	1913 water tower, one of the few remnants of the extensive civic infrastructure funded by unexpectedly high tax revenue generated by mining properties during the development of the Cuyuna Range. Likely demolished (see talk page).
14	Elevated Metal Water Tank, Trommald	Elevated Metal Water Tank, Trommald	October 22, 1980 (#80002038)	In Trommald; 46°30′26″N 94°01′14″W	Trommald	1918 water tower, one of the few remnants of the extensive civic infrastructure funded by unexpectedly high tax revenue generated by mining properties during the development of the Cuyuna Range.
15	Wilford H. Fawcett House	Wilford H. Fawcett House	May 23, 1980 (#80002036)	9252 Breezy Point Dr. 46°35′24″N 94°12′29″W	Breezy Point	Lodge-like summer home with guest rooms, built in the mid-1920s. Noted for its well crafted rustic architecture and association with Wilford Fawcett (1885–1940), founder of Fawcett Publications. Now a rental property within a lake resort.
16	Fort Flatmouth Mounds	Fort Flatmouth Mounds	August 14, 1973 (#73000975)	Address restricted	Crosslake vicinity	Elliptical group of mounds once misidentified as a fortification, significant for its information potential as a unique site in a region whose numerous mounds and villages indicate a long span of indigenous occupation.
17	Franklin Junior High School	Franklin Junior High School	June 4, 2009 (#09000406)	1001 Kingwood St. 46°21′34″N 94°11′38″W	Brainerd	Junior high school building whose 1932 original wing and 1954 addition reflect the evolving, research-based national standards for middle school design. Now the Franklin Arts Center.
18	Garrison Concourse	Garrison Concourse	December 3, 2013 (#13000882)	Jct. of U.S. 169 & MN 18; 46°17′39″N 93°49′26″W	Garrison	Large highway wayside built 1936–39 by the Civilian Conservation Corps, centerpiece of an early and extensive roadside development project. Also noted for its blend of formalism and National Park Service rustic design.
19	Gordon-Schaust Site	Gordon-Schaust Site	December 23, 1974 (#74001015)	Address restricted	Crosslake vicinity	Two separate but nearly parallel groups of linear mounds, undated but well preserved.
20	Grand View Lodge	Grand View Lodge	May 23, 1980 (#80002034)	23521 Nokomis Ave. 46°29′35″N 94°18′55″W	Nisswa	Lake resort with two notable buildings: a main lodge constructed in the mid-1920s with some of north central Minnesota's most elaborate rustic log architecture, and a 1918 lodge that was one of the region's earliest.
21	Werner Hemstead House	Werner Hemstead House	May 23, 1980 (#80002024)	303 N. 4th St. 46°21′34″N 94°12′15″W	Brainerd	House built circa 1900, significant for its locally unique Neoclassical architecture and its association with prominent Brainerd politician and commerce leader Werner Hempstead (1860–1952).
22	Ironton City Hall	Ironton City Hall	June 14, 2002 (#02000637)	309 3rd St. 46°28′44″N 93°58′38″W	Ironton	Multipurpose municipal hall built in 1917, center of Ironton's governmental and civic life by housing the city's offices, fire department, library, jail, and an auditorium that hosted numerous community organizations and events.
23	Ironton Sintering Plant Complex	Ironton Sintering Plant Complex	September 11, 1980 (#80002031)	County Highway 30; 46°29′22″N 93°58′26″W	Crosby	1924 sintering facility with eight contributing properties—the second major beneficiation plant ever built in the United States, illustrating a key innovation in the iron and steel industry to exploit low-grade iron ore.
24	Kenney Lake Overlook	Kenney Lake Overlook	November 16, 2015 (#15000789)	MN 18, 900 ft. SW. of N. Kenney Lake Ln. 46°19′38″N 93°50′34″W	Garrison vicinity	1939 wayside significant as a key component of a major highway improvement project, for representing the work of the CCC Veterans Division and the earliest scenic improvements of the Minnesota Highway Department, and for its fine National Park Service rustic design.
25	Milford Mine Historic District	Milford Mine Historic District	August 10, 2011 (#11000525)	1 mile southwest of junction of MN 6 and County Road 30; 46°32′05″N 93°58′15″W	Wolford vicinity	Remains of the Milford Mine, active 1912–1932 and site of Minnesota's worst mining disaster, in which 41 miners were killed February 2, 1924. Now a memorial county park.
26	Minnesota and International Railroad Freight House and Shelter Shed	Minnesota and International Railroad Freight House and Shelter Shed	May 27, 1980 (#80002033)	County Highway 30; 46°30′06″N 94°15′31″W	Nisswa vicinity	Open-air railway shelter built circa 1918, the only surviving example in North Central Minnesota and a reminder of the railroad-dependent early years of the summer resort industry. Better known as the Lake Hubert Depot.
27	Minnewawa Lodge	Minnewawa Lodge	August 11, 1980 (#80002035)	24621 S. Clark Lake Rd. 46°30′34″N 94°16′02″W	Nisswa	Rare surviving example of the region's earliest resorts, with three wood-frame buildings constructed from the 1890s to the 1920s before rustic architecture became the style of choice.
28	Northern Pacific Railroad Shops Historic District	Northern Pacific Railroad Shops Historic District	January 3, 1989 (#88003024)	Roughly bounded by the Burlington Northern railroad tracks, Laurel, and 13th Sts. 46°21′23″N 94°11′08″W	Brainerd	One of Minnesota's few surviving examples of a large railroad maintenance complex, with 12 contributing properties built 1882–1938, and the best reminder of Brainerd's leading employer, the Northern Pacific Railway, from the 1870s to the 1960s.
29	Parker Building	Parker Building	May 23, 1980 (#80002025)	623 Laurel St. 46°21′21″N 94°11′59″W	Brainerd	Highly intact example of an early-20th-century commercial block, built in 1909, and host to numerous local businesses including one of Brainerd's first two banks.
30	Pequot Fire Lookout Tower	Pequot Fire Lookout Tower	July 10, 2017 (#100001297)	Cty. Rd. 11 about 0.5 mi. E. of Cty. Rd. 112; 46°36′14″N 94°17′50″W	Pequot Lakes	Well-preserved fire lookout tower built in 1935, reflecting the New Deal's attention on forestry and meaningful work projects, and providing protection and public education on forest management in a key tourist region.
31	Red River Trail: Crow Wing Section	Red River Trail: Crow Wing Section	February 6, 1991 (#90002201)	Off County Highway 27 in Crow Wing State Park; 46°16′30″N 94°20′11″W	Baxter vicinity	Well-preserved fragment of the Woods Trail route of the Red River Trails, in use 1844–1871, that runs 1.5 miles (2.4 km) from a Mississippi River crossing through the townsite of Old Crow Wing. Now a hiking trail.
32	St. Alban's Bay Culvert at Mille Lacs Lake	St. Alban's Bay Culvert at Mille Lacs Lake	November 16, 2015 (#15000788)	U.S. Route 169, 800 ft. N. of Cty. Rd. 26; 46°16′29″N 93°49′19″W	Garrison vicinity	Rare example of a bridge built by the state highway department's recreational development division, constructed 1938–39 as part of an extensive New Deal project along the shore of Mille Lacs Lake. Also noted for its National Park Service rustic design.
33	Sebre Lake Site (21-CW-55)	Sebre Lake Site (21-CW-55)	November 16, 1984 (#84000445)	Address restricted	Fort Ripley vicinity	One of the richest archaeological sites in the Nokasippi River Valley, yielding habitation and burial features accumulated over 4,000 years of episodic use from the Archaic to the Late Woodland period.
34	Soo Line Depot	Soo Line Depot	November 25, 1980 (#80002026)	1st St., N. and 1st Ave., E. 46°29′01″N 93°57′01″W	Crosby	1910 railway station that was an essential conduit for the arrival of goods and people and the export of iron ore during central Crow Wing County's major economic boom. Now a museum.
35	Spina Hotel	Spina Hotel	May 23, 1980 (#80002032)	Curtis Ave. and 4th St. 46°28′40″N 93°58′36″W	Ironton	1913 hotel with multiple commercial spaces and grandly designed architecture, illustrating the scale of civic development anticipated but never fully achieved during the boom years of the Cuyuna Range.
36	St. Columba Mission Site	St. Columba Mission Site	December 18, 1973 (#73000974)	Address restricted	Nisswa vicinity	Site of an Episcopal mission to the Ojibwe in use 1852–1862, offering a well-dated archaeological assemblage to illuminate the lives of Minnesota's early missionaries and their converts.
37	Upper Hay Lake Archeological District	Upper Hay Lake Archeological District	January 21, 1974 (#74001016)	Address restricted	Jenkins vicinity	About 75 linear mounds—including one of the state's longest at 725 feet (221 m)—plus the sites of a village and a portage, indicating an area of substantial activity during the Blackduck phase of the Late Woodland period.

== See also ==
- List of National Historic Landmarks in Minnesota
- National Register of Historic Places listings in Minnesota
