= Spina Hotel =

- U.S. National Register of Historic Places
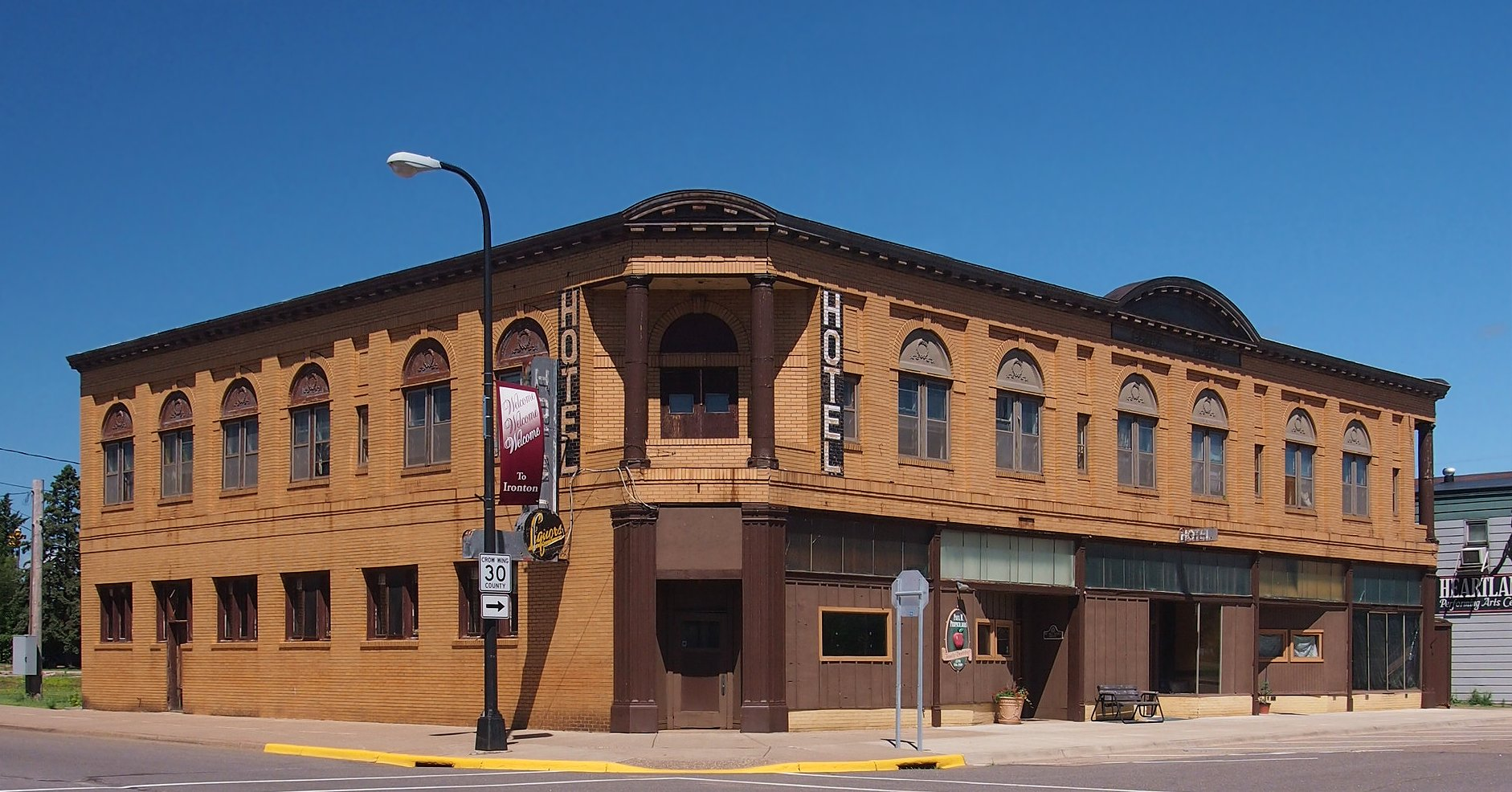
- The Spina Hotel from the southeast

- Location within Minnesota Location within the United States
- Location: Curtis Avenue and 4th Street, Ironton, Minnesota
- Coordinates: 46°28′40″N 93°58′35.5″W
- Area: Less than one acre
- Built: 1913
- NRHP reference No.: 80002032
- Designated: May 23, 1980

The Spina Hotel is a historic former hotel building in Ironton, Minnesota, United States. It was built in 1913 with multiple commercial spaces and grandly designed architecture. The building was listed on the National Register of Historic Places in 1980 for having local significance in the themes of architecture and commerce. It was nominated for illustrating the scale of civic development anticipated but never fully achieved during the boom years of iron mining on the Cuyuna Range.

== Description ==
The Spina Hotel is a two-story brick building with a footprint of 100 by 75 feet (30 by 23 m). The northeast and southeast corners are cut off at an angle, and contain the principal doors. Cast iron columns decorate the eastern façade of the first floor and both angled corners. The building's National Register nomination describes the overall style as "mild commercial classicism."

The second story has a deep indentation at the rear, giving it a U-shape. The two angled corners sport false balconies flanked by wooden columns. All along the second story, paired one-over-one sash windows are topped by arches filled with decorative iron panels.

At the time of the building's nomination to the National Register in 1980, the first floor interior contained the hotel lobby, a bar, a barbershop, another commercial storefront, and a post office, while the hotel rooms were all on the second floor. At that time some of the original interior details, such as wood trim, pressed metal ceilings, and light fixtures, were still extant.

== History ==
The Spina Hotel was built in 1913 as the local economy was developing rapidly from iron mining on the Cuyuna Range. The hotel's design anticipated an era of grandiosity. However the economic boom never fully materialized, and Ironton's population began to decline after 1920. The Spina Hotel remains a largely intact vestige of a deliriously optimistic period in local history.

== See also ==
- National Register of Historic Places listings in Crow Wing County, Minnesota
