= Cuyuna =

Cuyuna may refer to:

- AMW Cuyuna Engine Company
- Cuyuna Country State Recreation Area
- Cuyuna 430 - engine
- Cuyuna Iron Range Municipally-Owned Elevated Metal Water Tanks
- Cuyuna, Minnesota
- Cuyuna Range
- Cuyuna Scout Camp
