= Crosby station =

Crosby station could refer to:

- Crosby station (Minnesota), a historic train station in Crosby, Minnesota, United States
- Crosby railway station, a closed railway station on the Isle of Man
- Blundellsands & Crosby railway station, a railway station in Merseyside, England, United Kingdom
