= Crosby station (Minnesota) =

Crosby
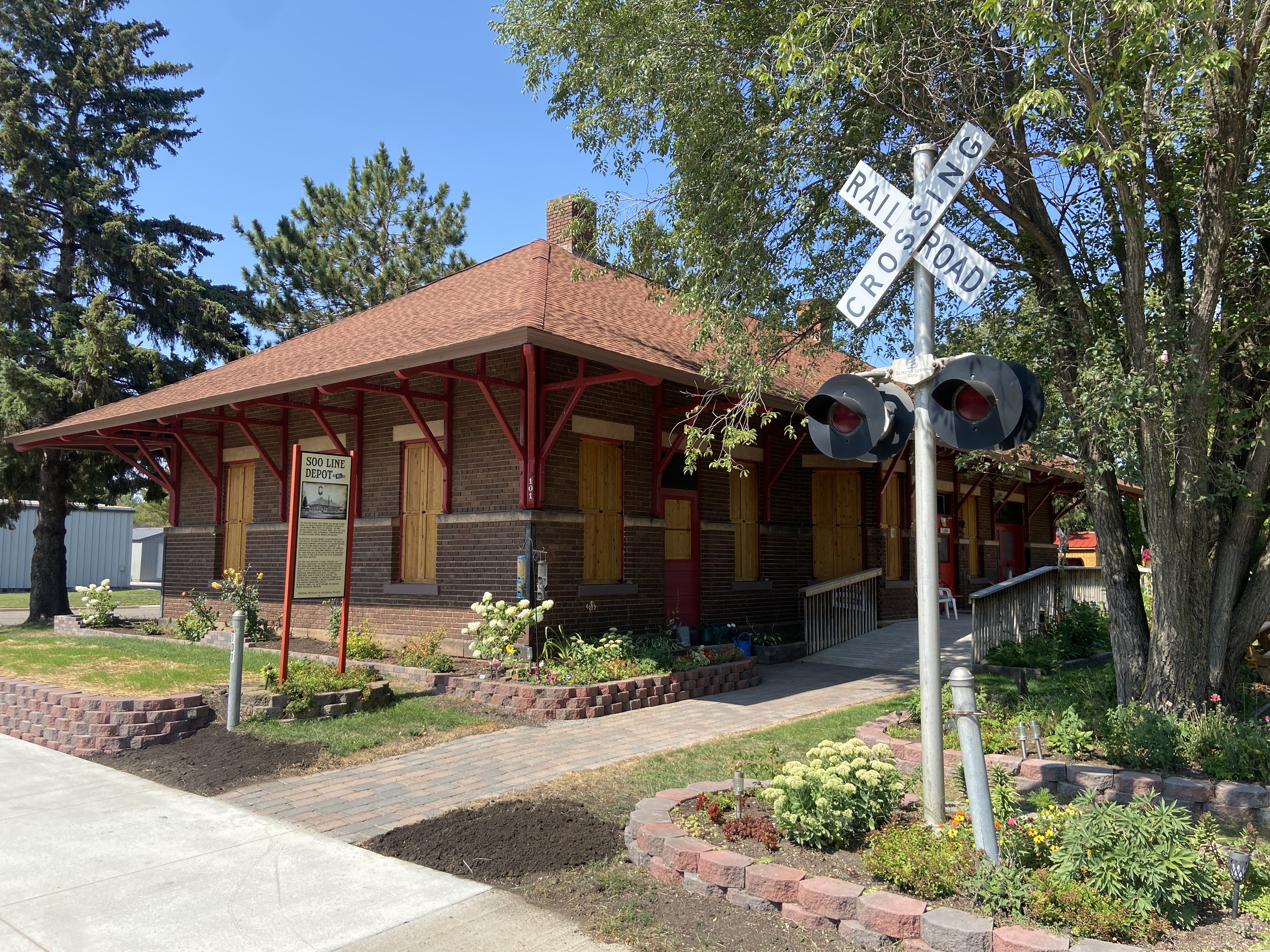
- The Crosby Soo Line Depot/Cuyuna Range Museum from the southeast

General information
- Location: 101 1st Street Northeast, Crosby, Minnesota 56441
- System: Former Soo Line passenger rail station

History
- Opened: 1910

Services
Preceding station	Soo Line	Following station
Ironton toward Riverton	Riverton – McGregor	Cuyuna toward McGregor
- Crosby Railroad Depot
- U.S. National Register of Historic Places
- Location within Minnesota Location within the United States
- Location: 101 1st Street Northeast, Crosby, Minnesota
- Coordinates: 46°29′1″N 93°57′0.5″W
- Area: Less than one acre
- Built: 1910
- NRHP reference No.: 80002026
- Designated: November 25, 1980
Location

Crosby station is a historic former train station in Crosby, Minnesota, United States. It was established in 1910. It was listed on the National Register of Historic Places in 1980 as the Crosby Railroad Depot for having local significance in the themes of commerce, industry, and transportation. The depot was nominated for being an essential conduit for the arrival of goods and people and the export of iron ore during central Crow Wing County's economic boom years.

The building now serves as the Cuyuna Range Museum, operated by the Cuyuna Iron Range Heritage Network.

== History ==
The Crosby Soo Line Depot initially served as a train station for the Minneapolis, St. Paul and Sault Ste. Marie Railway (later the Soo Line Railroad starting in 1961). The station was part of a project conducted from 1908 to 1910 to build a rail line from Superior, Wisconsin, to Thief River Falls, Minnesota, along with a branch through Crosby to access the Cuyuna Range iron mines.

== Museum ==
The Cuyuna Range Museum interprets historical events and daily life on the Cuyuna Range through displays of artifacts, documents, and photos. Holdings include a display on the Milford Mine disaster, vintage wedding dresses, logging and mining tools, and a replica of the Project Manhigh capsule launched nearby in 1957.

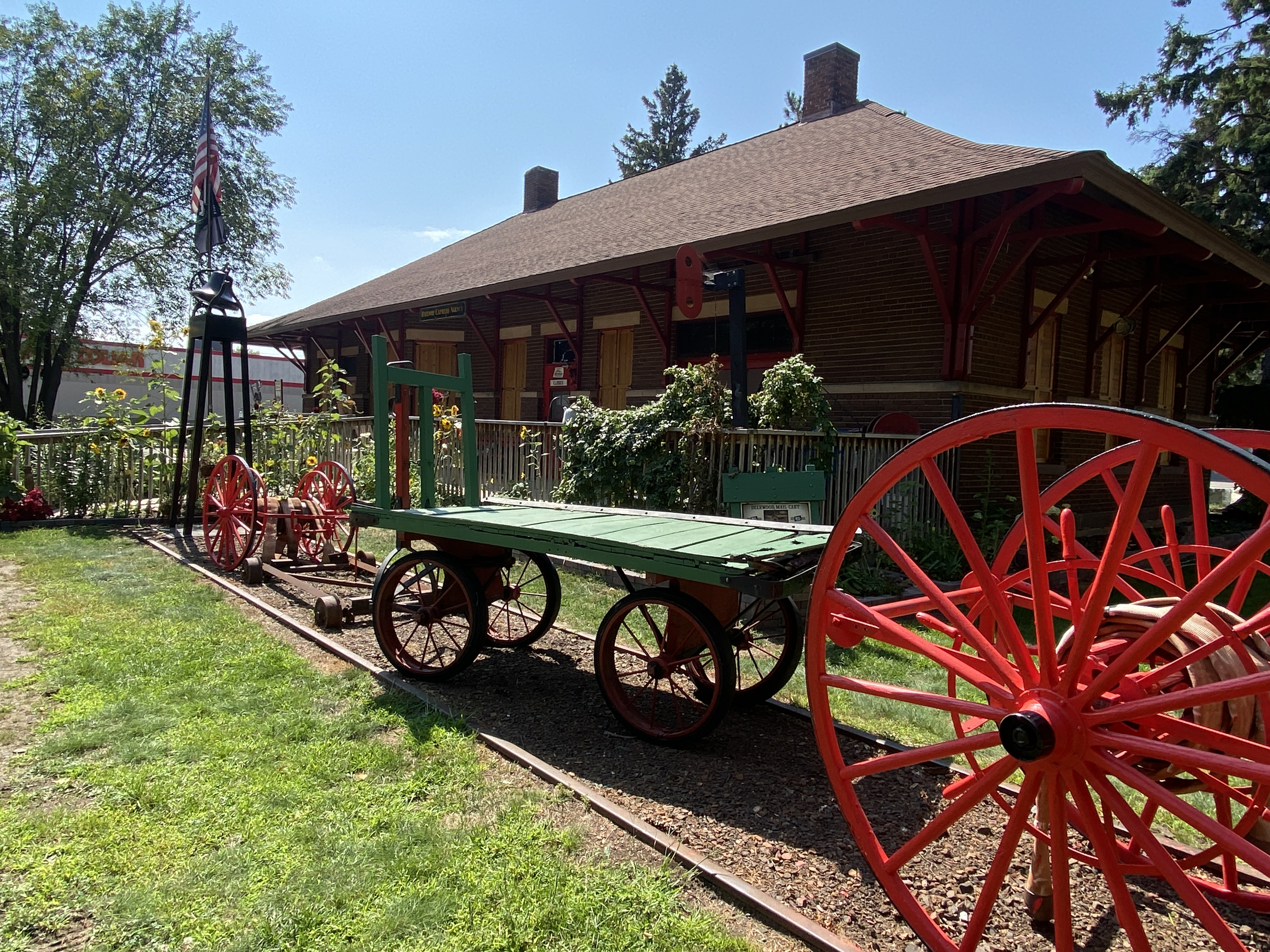

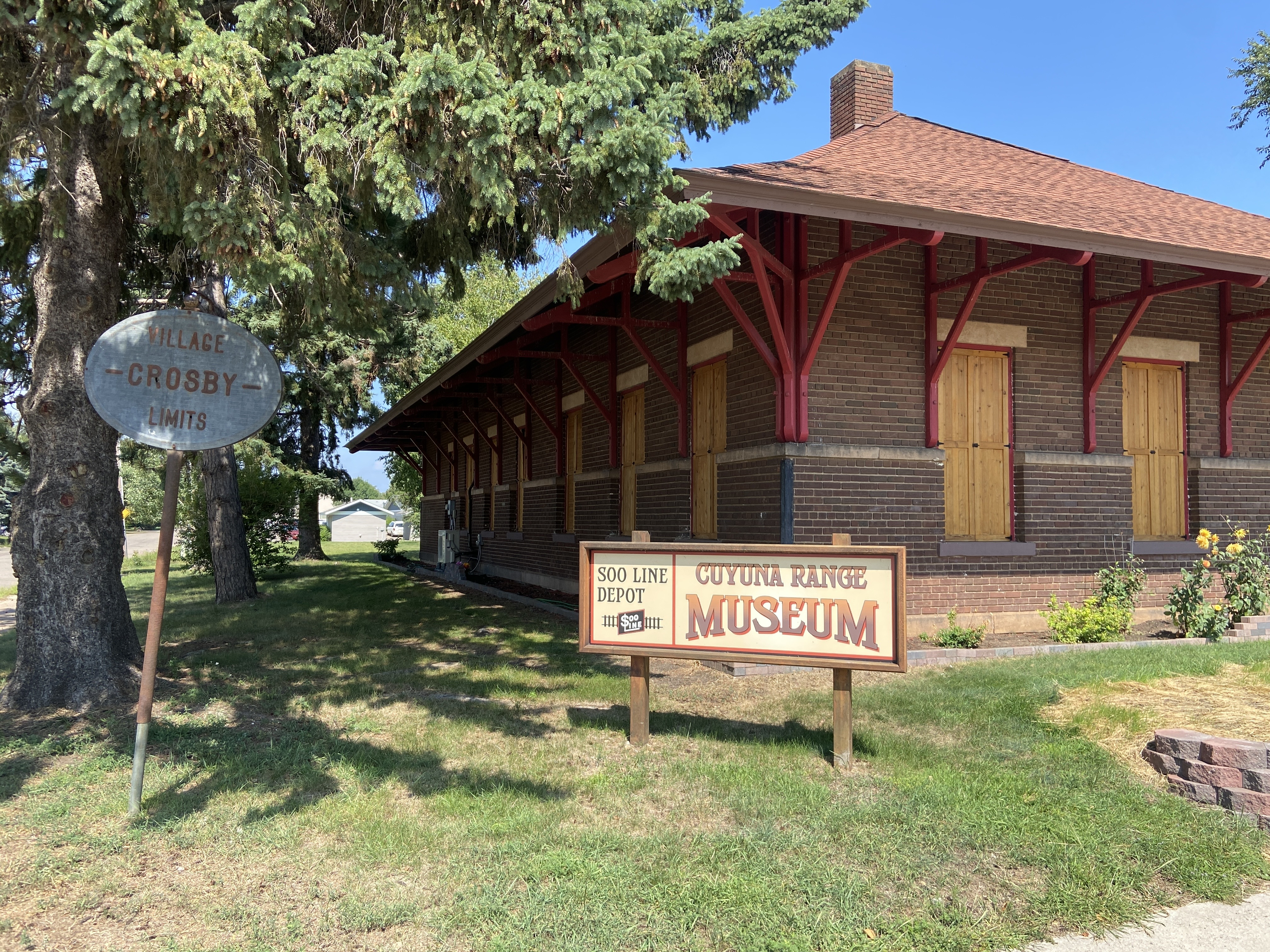

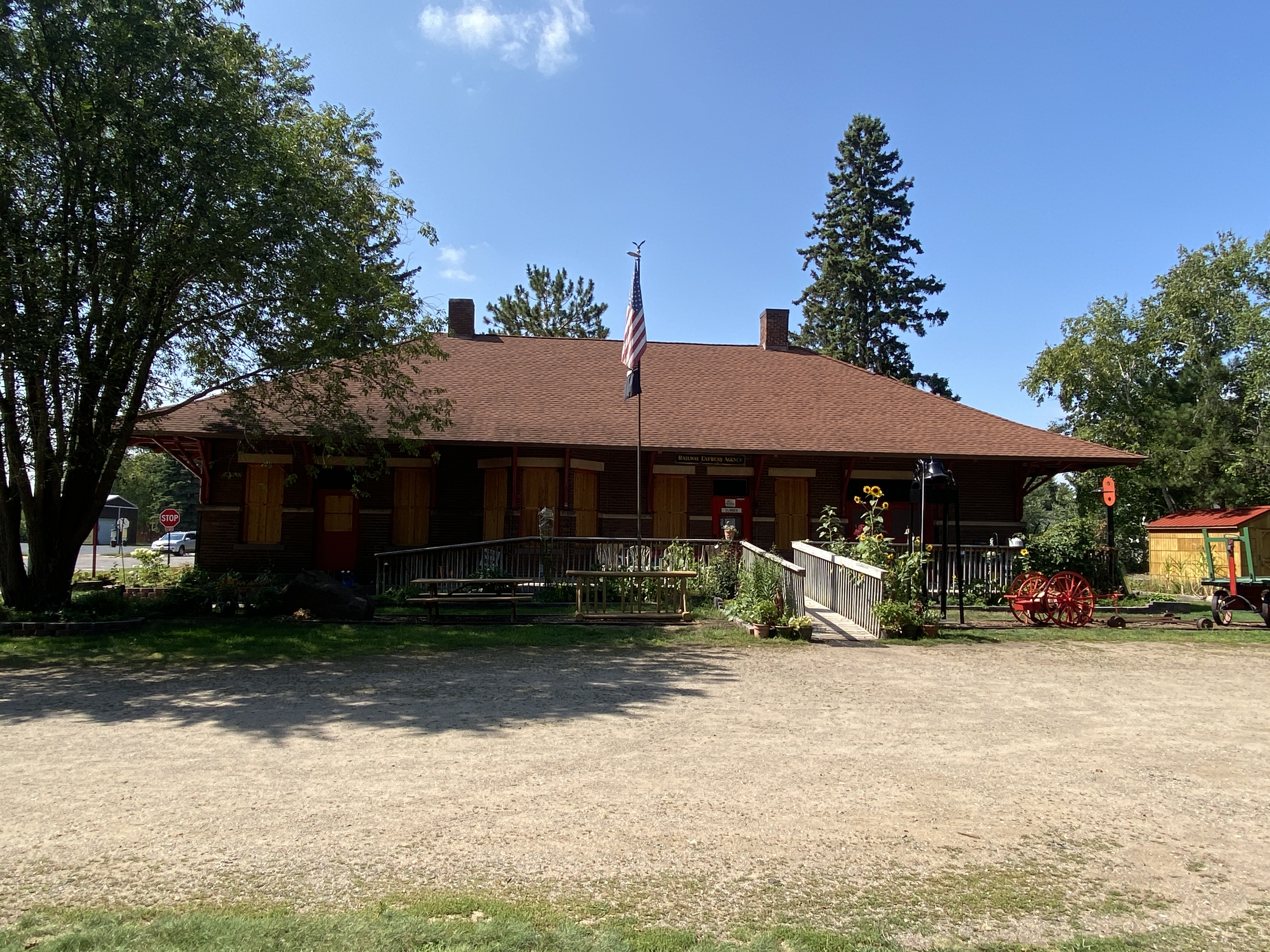

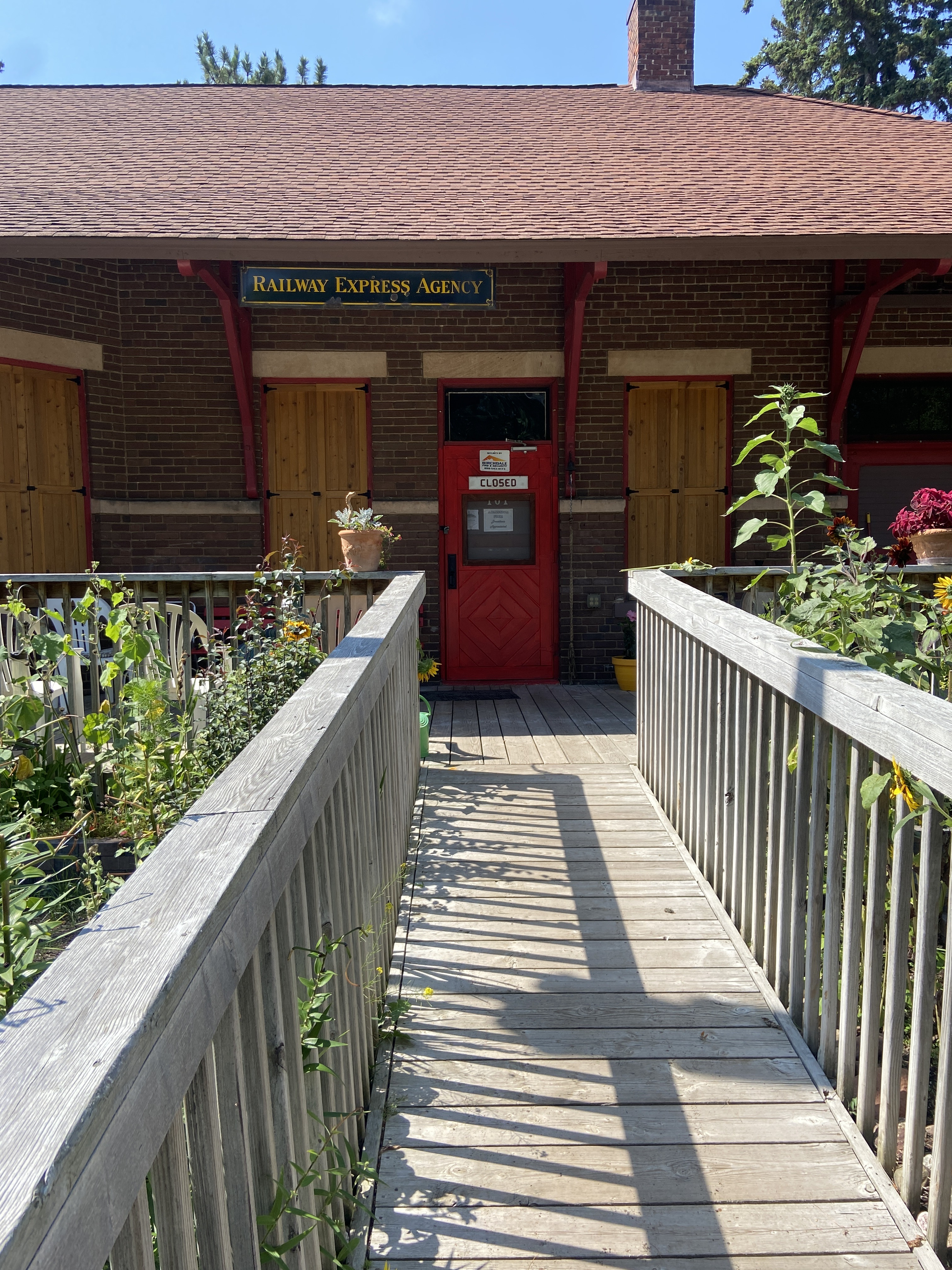

== See also ==
- List of museums in Minnesota
- National Register of Historic Places listings in Crow Wing County, Minnesota
