= Cuyuna Iron Range Municipally-Owned Elevated Metal Water Tanks =

- U.S. National Register of Historic Places
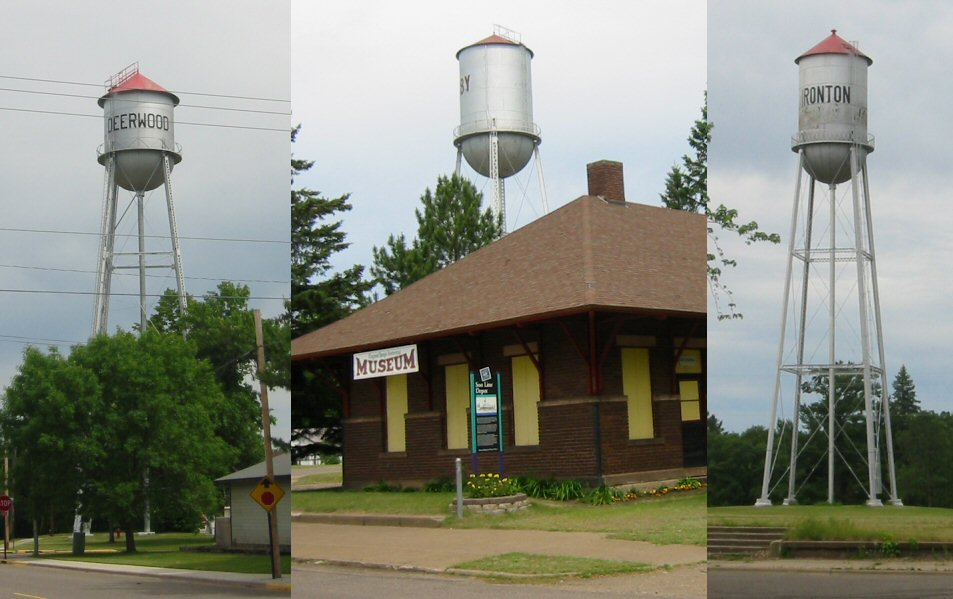
- The water tanks in Deerwood, Crosby, and Ironton respectively, in 2006
- Location: Crosby, Minnesota; Cuyuna, Minnesota; Deerwood, Minnesota; Ironton, Minnesota; Trommald, Minnesota
- Area: Cuyuna Range
- Built: 1912-1918
- Architect: Des Moines Bridge & Iron Co.; Minneapolis Steel Machinery Co.
- MPS: Cuyuna Iron Range Municipally-Owned Elevated Metal Water Tanks TR
- NRHP reference No.: 80002027
- Added to NRHP: October 22, 1980

The Cuyuna Iron Range Municipally-Owned Elevated Metal Water Tanks are a group of five water towers within the Cuyuna Range in Crow Wing County, Minnesota. The water tanks, built between 1912 and 1918, were listed on the National Register of Historic Places because they represent the historical period of community planning, public works, and engineering that supported the development of the Cuyuna Range. Their construction was made possible by a favorable property tax arrangement on the iron mines that brought significant revenues to the towns of Crosby, Cuyuna, Deerwood, Ironton, and Trommald. The communities began around 1910, when iron mining started on the Range. The peak of mining employment was around 1920, and it started to decline around 1930. By the 1950s, iron mining was well in decline on the Cuyuna Range. As of 2022, it appears only two of the water tanks survive at their original locations.

State historian Theodore C. Blegen wrote,

A singular aspect of range-town life was the blossoming of schools, community buildings, parks, splendid streets, and other public improvements built generously, not to say lavishly. They set standards far beyond those of most Minnesota cities at the time. These reflected at once a public desire for the best, a concern on the part of citizens for the education of their children, and the availability of taxes to provide the funds without stint for public wants.

Even the smaller communities were able to install complete water systems. After the end of iron mining, as the communities lost population, many of the publicly funded improvements such as schools have disappeared, and many of the houses have either been torn down or were left abandoned and dilapidated. Within Trommald and Cuyuna, the water towers are the most visible remains of the mining boom years.

The five water towers are each separately listed on the National Register, as:

- Elevated Metal Water Tank, Crosby (reference number 80002027), apparently no longer extant; formerly located approximately at , (Note: The Crosby one no longer exists; it does not appear behind the Crosby Soo Line Depot (as it once did per File:Crosby Soo Line Depot 1.jpg) in Google Street View imagery dated August 2014 or in Google satellite view as of January 2022.)

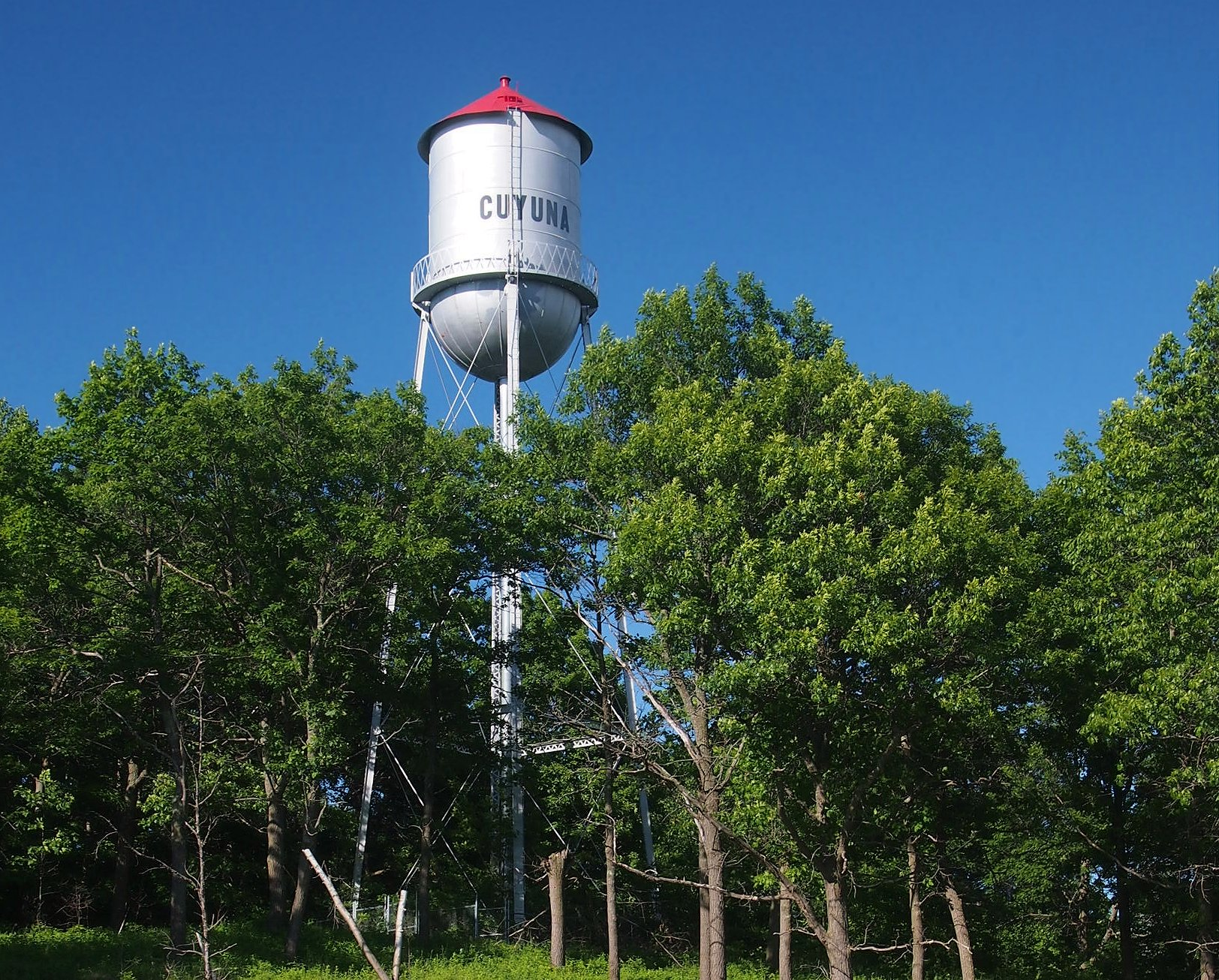
Cuyuna one, in 2016

- Elevated Metal Water Tank, Cuyuna (80002028), at , (Note: Cuyuna one appears in Google Street View dated July 2014 and in Google satellite view of 2022.)

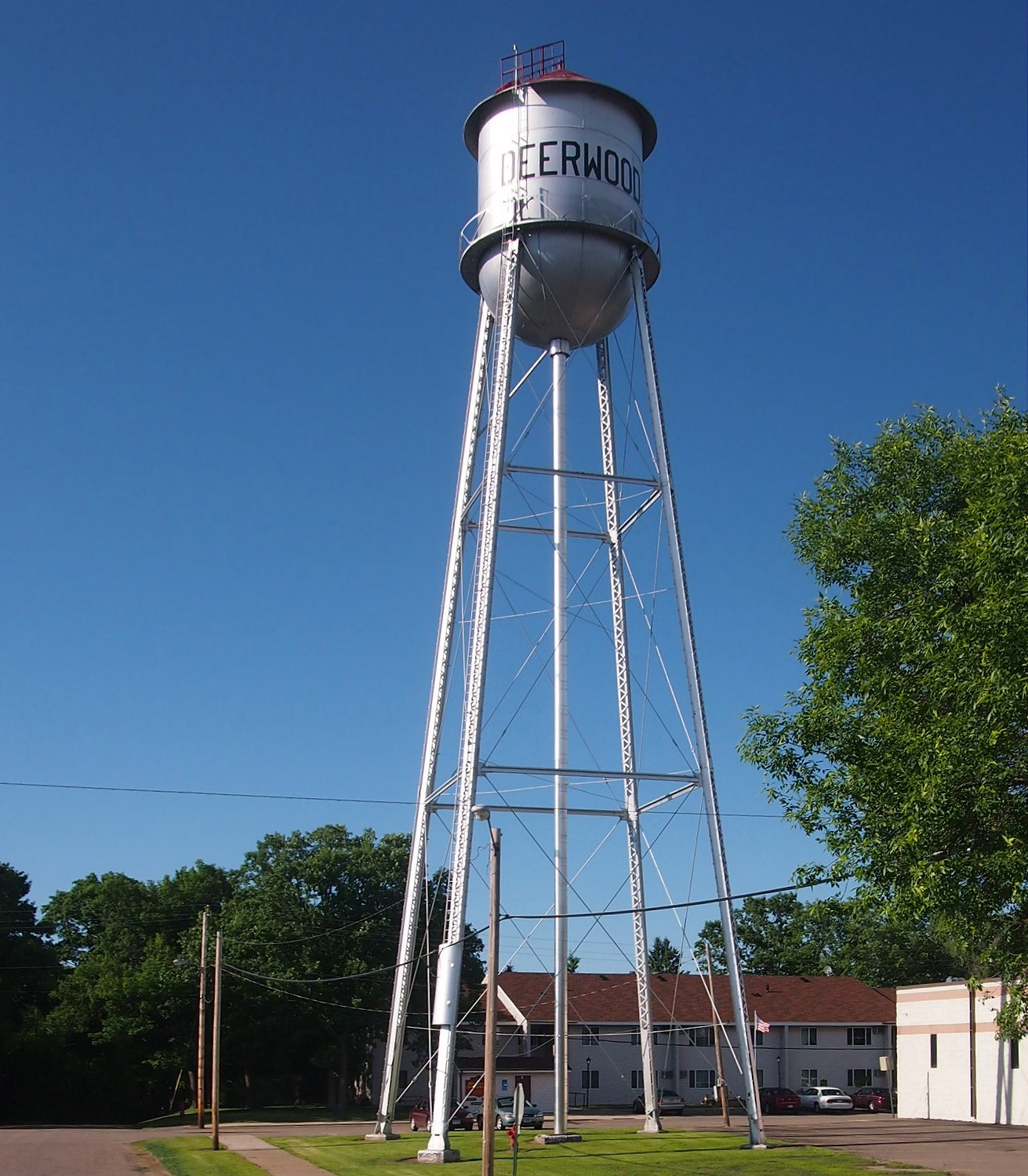
Deerwood one, in 2016

- Elevated Metal Water Tank, Deerwood (80002029), formerly located at , (Note: The Deerwood one was apparently demolished after July 2021, as Minnesota Prairie Roots photos show it existing then. And it appeared in Google Street View imagery dated July 2014 at exactly these coordinates. But it does not appear in current Google satellite view of 2022, which shows a bare area there now.)
- Elevated Metal Water Tank, Ironton (80002030), whose moved location was formerly located approximately at , (Note: Does not appear in July 2014 Google Street View imagery, nor in current satellite views. Approximate location per NRIS is near "WT Park" (perhaps "Water Tower Park", perhaps another name for Morningside Park) location identified in Google maps. A modern water tower labelled "Ironton" is located at .) Per a Brainerd Dispatch editorial, the Ironton water tower, originally located in north Ironton, was moved to Ironton's Morningside Park because underground mining of an iron ore vein made the ground unstable. It was moved on a windy day south along Curtis Avenue and was photographed mid-move in front of the Spina Hotel Block. When the editorial was written, demolition of the (moved) tower was planned; the city council was voting to appropriate $6,000 for its demolition.

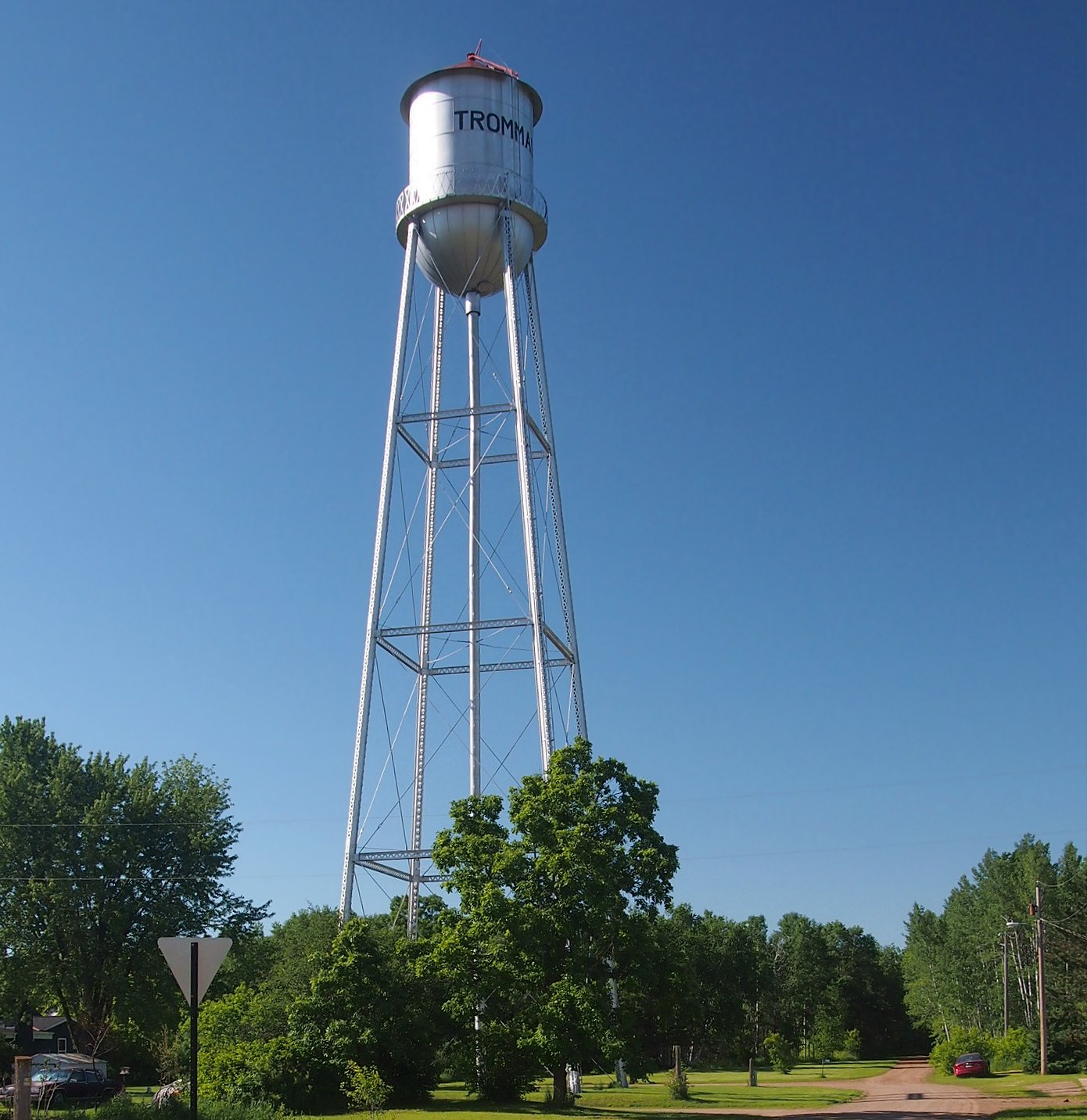
Trommald Water Tank, in 2016

- Elevated Metal Water Tank, Trommald (80002038), at . (Note: Trommald one appears in Google satellite view labelled 2022.)

== See also ==
- National Register of Historic Places listings in Crow Wing County, Minnesota
