= Wolford, Minnesota =

Unincorporated community in Minnesota, United States

Wolford
- Unincorporated community
- Location within Minnesota Location within the United States
- Coordinates: 46°32′44″N 93°58′45″W
- Country: United States
- State: Minnesota
- County: Crow Wing
- Township: Wolford Township
- Elevation: 1,214 ft (370 m)
- Time zone: UTC-6 (Central (CST))
  - Summer (DST): UTC-5 (CDT)
- ZIP code: 56441
- Area code: 218
- GNIS feature ID: 654326

Wolford is an unincorporated community in Wolford Township, Crow Wing County, Minnesota, United States, near Crosby. It is along Crow Wing County Road 30 near River Road. State Highway 6 (MN 6) and County Road 11 are both nearby. Perry Lake Township is also in the immediate area.

Wolford was platted in 1913.
