= Sebre Lake Site =

- Sebre Lake Site (21-CW-55)
- U.S. National Register of Historic Places
- Location: Address restricted, Fort Ripley Township, Minnesota
- Area: 5 acres (2.0 ha)
- Built: c. 3000 BCE – c. 900 CE
- NRHP reference No.: 84000445
- Designated: November 16, 1984

The Sebre Lake Site (Smithsonian trinomial 21CW55) is a prehistoric Native American archaeological site in Fort Ripley Township, Minnesota, United States. It has yielded habitation and burial features accumulated over 4,000 years of intermittent use from the mid-Archaic to the early Late Woodland period. The site was listed on the National Register of Historic Places in 1984 for having local significance in the theme of archaeology. It was nominated for being one of the richest archaeological sites in the Nokasippi River Valley.

== Use ==
The occupational and burial features at the Sebre Lake Site suggest it was used intensively but intermittently over at least 4,000 years. It is well positioned to take advantage of natural resources, with good fishing in the adjacent lake, close access to the Mississippi River transportation corridor, and nearby prairie openings that would have attracted deer, elk, and bison.

== Archaeological history ==
The Sebre Lake Site was first documented by Euro-Americans in 1901, when Jacob V. Brower identified it as an ancient village site while conducting an archaeological survey of Crow Wing County. He did not examine the site long, but asked some local residents to provide him with any artifacts they could find. These likely form the basis of the large assemblage of items from Sebre Lake in Brower's collection, now curated by the Minnesota Historical Society. They include stone tools from the Archaic, Middle Woodland, and early Late Woodland periods, as well as ceramic sherds from the early Late Woodland.

In the 1930s several human burials were exposed by agricultural activity. Minnesota state archaeologists investigated the site more closely in 1978. They found ceramics from the Onamia and Malmo cultural complexes, a projectile point, lithic flakes, a fire-cracked rock, and bone fragments. As some lake cabins had been built atop part of the site, the archaeologists interviewed the landowners. One had a collection of late Middle Woodland ceramics found on his property; these were identified as Brainerd and St. Croix Stamped wares.

The Sebre Lake Site has yielded one of the largest and most varied archaeological collections in the Nokasippi Valley, and is one of only three major habitation sites known in the vicinity.

== See also ==
- National Register of Historic Places listings in Crow Wing County, Minnesota
