= Grand View Lodge =

- U.S. National Register of Historic Places
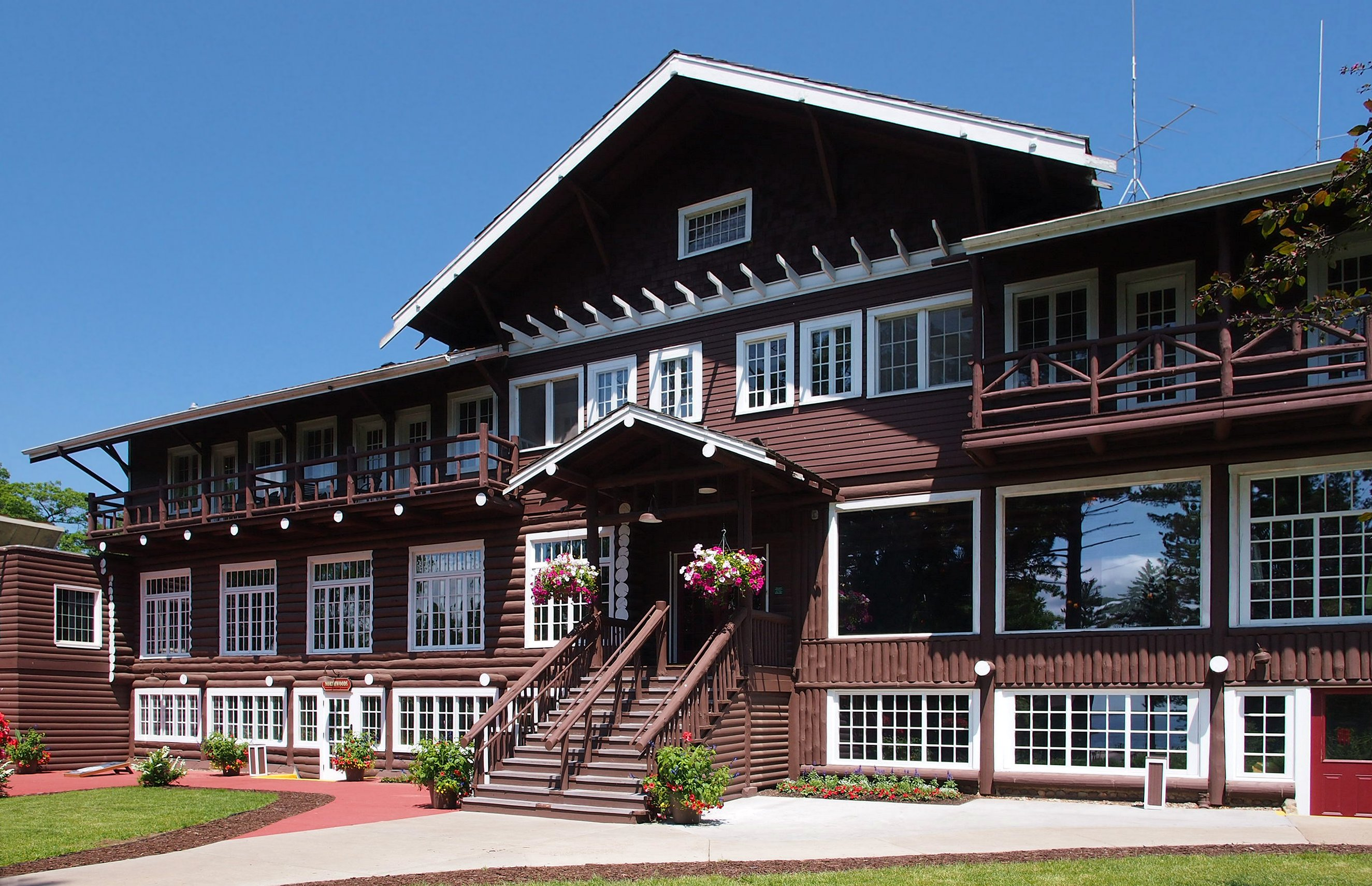
- Grand View Lodge's main building from the southeast

- Location within Minnesota Location within the United States
- Location: 23521 Nokomis Avenue, Nisswa, Minnesota
- Coordinates: 46°29′34.5″N 94°18′55″W
- Area: 16.26 acres (6.58 ha)
- Built: 1916, 1921
- Architectural style: Rustic
- NRHP reference No.: 80002034
- Designated: May 23, 1980

The Grand View Lodge is a resort on Gull Lake in Nisswa, Minnesota, United States. Established in 1916, it has grown to include seven restaurants, a spa, two golf courses, a conference center, and over 200 guest cabins. Two of the complex's buildings were listed together on the National Register of Historic Places in 1980 for having local significance in the themes of architecture and entertainment/recreation. They were nominated for displaying some of north-central Minnesota's most elaborate rustic log architecture, and for the older building's status as one of the region's earliest resort lodges.

== History ==
The Grand View Lodge property was first homesteaded in 1896 by the Berghs, a family of Danish immigrants. They did not prosper, however, and sold away the land in 1908. By 1915 new owners had converted the Berghs' old log cabin into a modest fishing lodge. The following year, Minneapolis-based real estate developer Marvin V. Baker purchased the property and began selling it off as individual lakeshore lots. He had prospective buyers stay in the existing lodge, a venue which proved so popular in its own right that he decided to build a full new guest facility.

What became the Main Lodge was constructed of red pines harvested on site. Since the as-yet-undammed Gull Lake fluctuated greatly in water level, the lodge was built well away from the lakeshore. It opened in June 1921, offering guest rooms, a restaurant, a lobby, and a large second-floor ballroom. In 1928 the second floor was converted into additional guest rooms and the event space was relocated to the newly finished basement. Baker also added a pair of guest cabins every year.

The Great Depression struck, however, and greatly curtailed revenues. In 1937 Baker sold the business to Reynolds Frederick Brownlee "Brownie" Cote and his wife Judy, who owned two children's camps on nearby Lake Hubert and were looking for a property that could provide lodging to their guests' parents. The Cotes built the Grand View into a successful resort, even opening a sister property in Arizona to provide a winter home for themselves and their employees.

The property opened its first full-size golf course in 1960. Two years later the Cotes bought out the remaining cabin owners and other investors to consolidate the Grand View as part of their family business. In the 1970s it achieved national attention as a tennis resort. The Norway Conference Center was added in 1984, the Pines Golf Course in 1990, the Preserve Golf Course in 1996, the Glacial Waters Spa in 2002, and the Gull Lake Center in 2009. The Grand View Lodge hosted the Minnesota Governor's Fishing Opener in 1976 and 2014.

== Main Lodge ==
The Main Lodge building stands on a slight hill 400 feet (120 m) from the lakeshore. It is a rectangular, three-story building with more recent additions built onto the west side. Main entrances are centered on the north and south façades under large gables. The walls are constructed mostly of horizontal logs, with some areas of vertical logs, and lap siding on much of the third floor. The wood is painted brown with white trim around windows and doors and on the end of projecting beams. Log balconies project from the third floor.

== See also ==
- National Register of Historic Places listings in Crow Wing County, Minnesota
