= Ironton Sintering Plant Complex =

- U.S. National Register of Historic Places
- U.S. Historic district
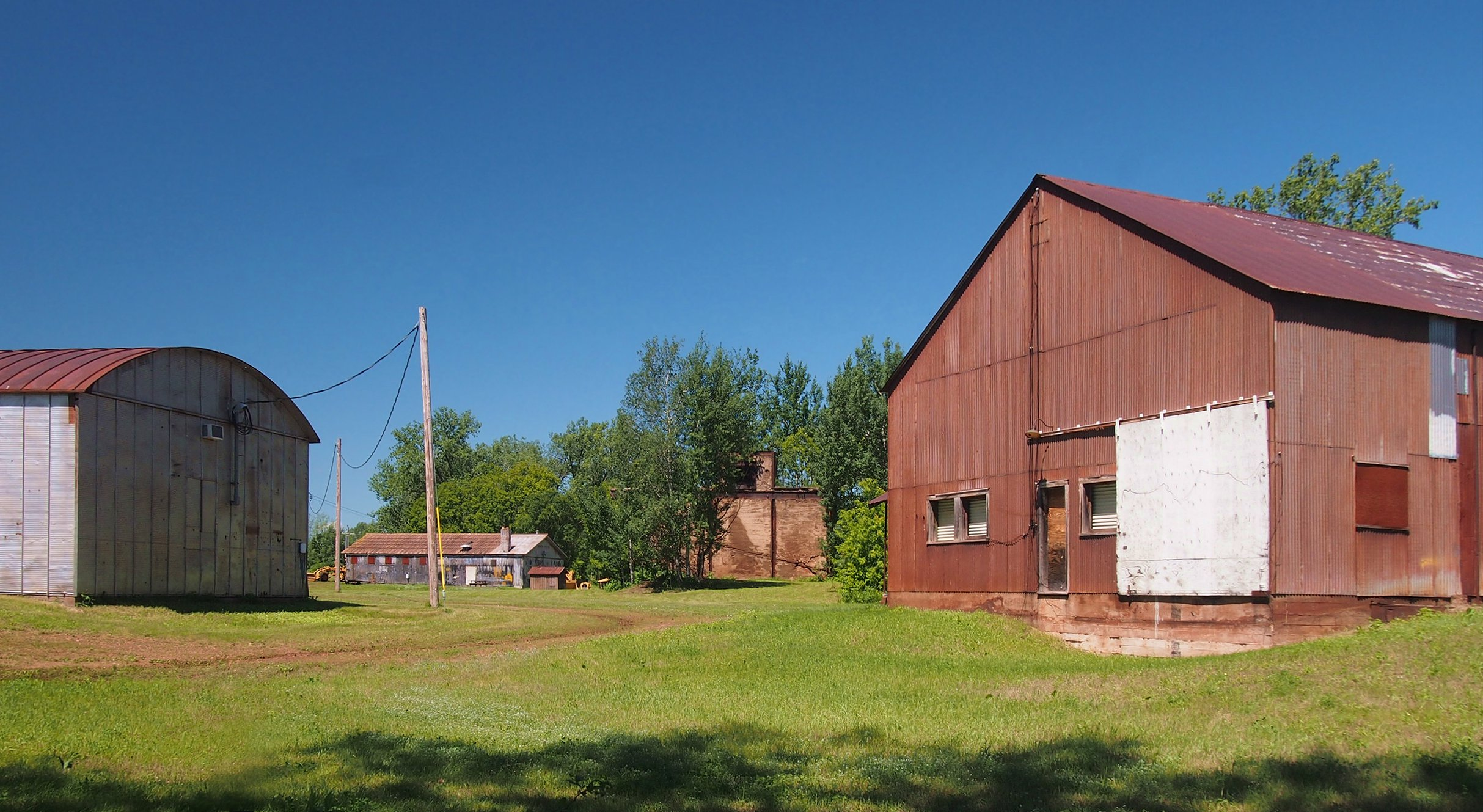
- The Ironton Sintering Plant Complex from the east

- Location within Minnesota Location within the United States
- Location: Co. Hwy. 30, Crosby, Minnesota
- Coordinates: 46°29′22″N 93°58′26″W
- Area: 20 acres (8.1 ha)
- Built: 1924
- Architect: Hanna Mining Co.
- NRHP reference No.: 80002031
- Added to NRHP: September 11, 1980

Ironton Sintering Plant Complex is a group of buildings north of Crosby, Minnesota, United States, listed on the National Register of Historic Places. The plant was built in 1924 by the Hanna Mining Company to sintering iron ore mined in the Cuyuna Range. The mining industry, after 1900, was seeking to exploit lower-grade iron deposits to meet the increasing demand of the iron and steel industry. To bring the ore to customers' specifications, the mines sought to "beneficiate" the ore through sintering, crushing, and washing. The sintering process was unique to the Cuyuna Range and made it possible to economically support mining.

The plant sits on the west shore of Portsmouth Mine Pit Lake, formerly an open mine pit. The plant contained eight structures at the time of nomination. The sintering structure and trestle consists of a tall, concrete structure, adjacent to a trestle that supported rail cars that were unloaded into the sintering chamber. The machine shops building was located immediately east of the sintering structure and trestle, and is built of steel with corrugated metal sheathing. Other buildings include a warehouse/shops building, a garage, an electric transformer building, an oil tank, and a dryhouse.

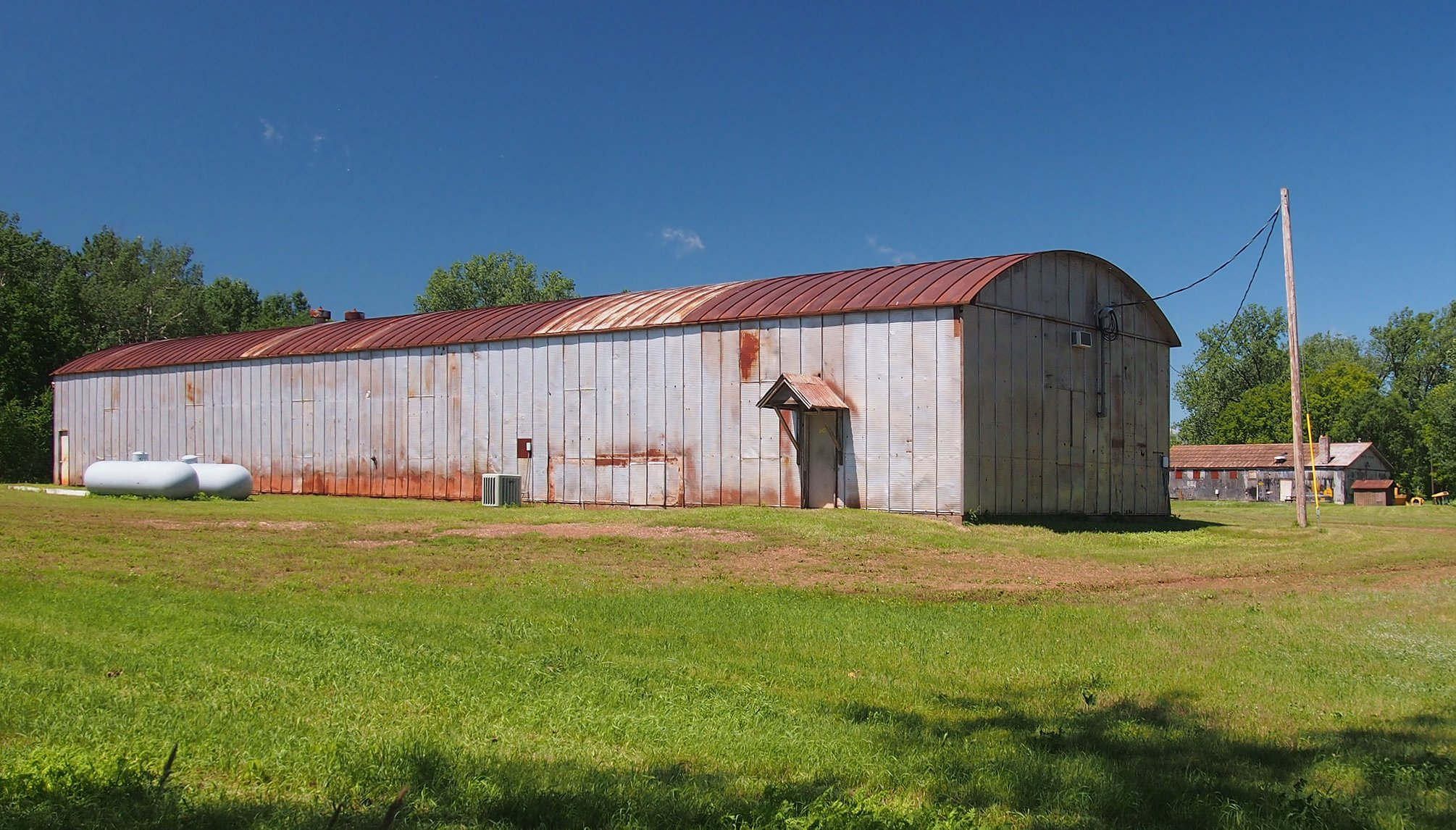
Garage and dryhouse (background right)

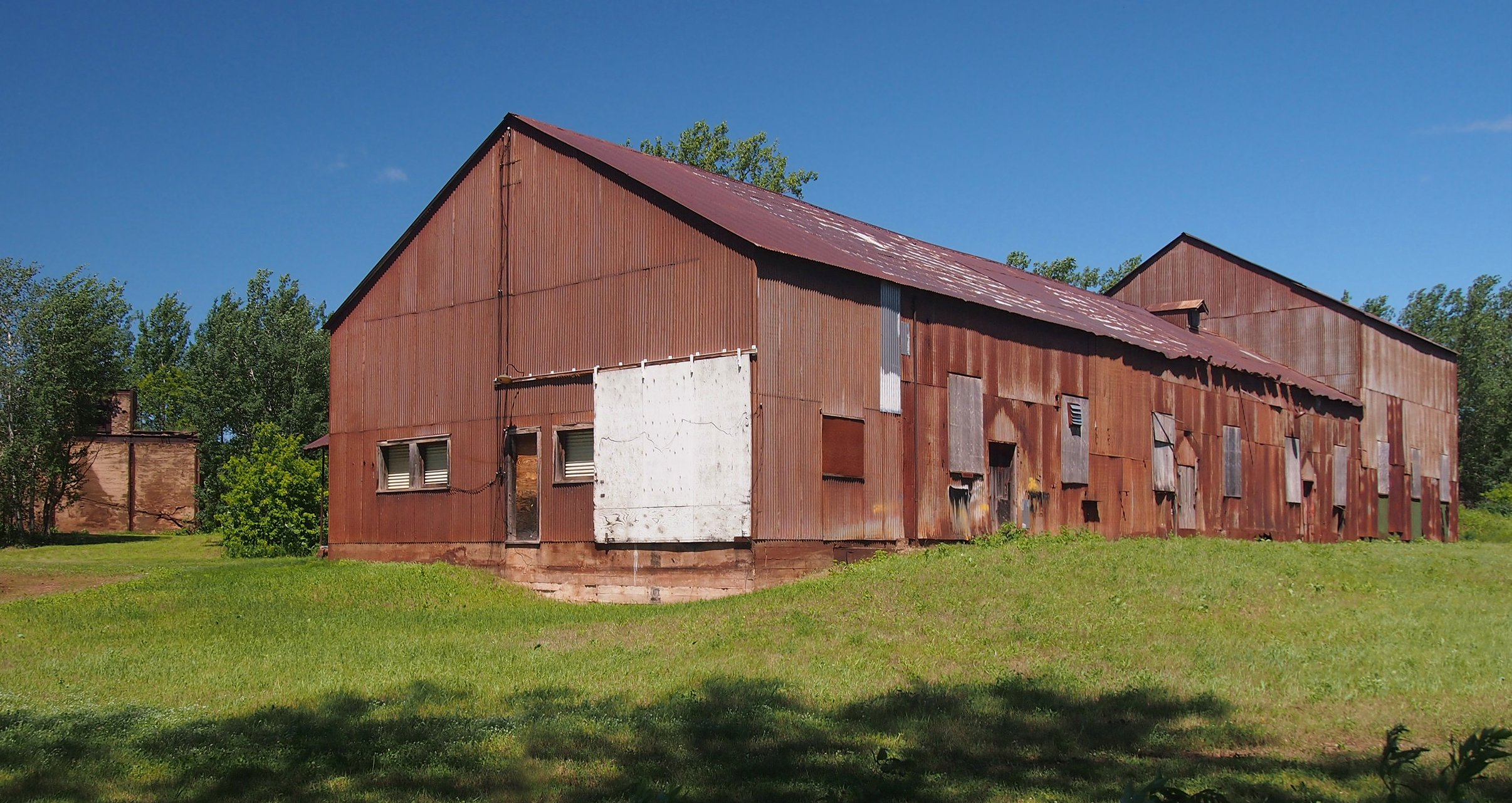
Sintering chamber (background left) and machine shop/warehouse
