= Lake Hubert station =

- Lake Hubert Depot
- U.S. National Register of Historic Places
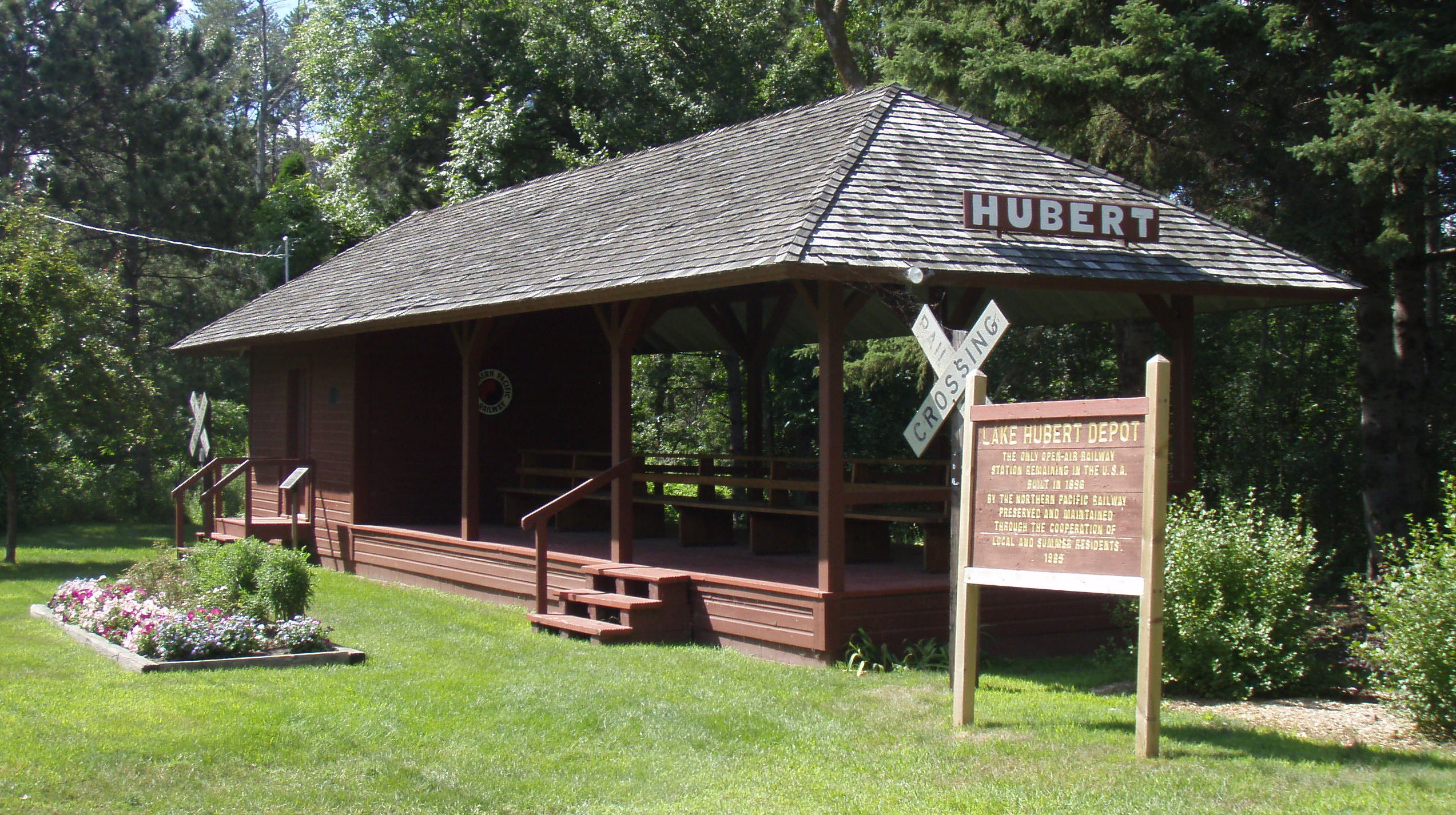
- Lake Hubert Depot (2011)

- Location within Minnesota Location within the United States
- Location: County Highway 30, Lake Hubert, Minnesota
- Coordinates: 46°30′06″N 94°15′31″W
- Built: circa 1918
- NRHP reference No.: 80002033
- Added to NRHP: May 27, 1980

Lake Hubert Depot in Lake Hubert, Minnesota, United States, is a one-story wood frame passenger depot built on the Minnesota and International Railway line around 1918. The rail line later became part of the Northern Pacific Railway and is now part of the Paul Bunyan State Trail.

It is divided into a single enclosed freight house, and three open bays for passenger accommodation. A double-sided wood bench is located along the center of the passenger section. The depot was built between Clark and Hubert lakes along the south side of the Minnesota and International Railway tracks. It was moved northwest approximately 400 ft. to its present location around 1970.
