= Trommald, Minnesota =

City in Minnesota, United States

- City
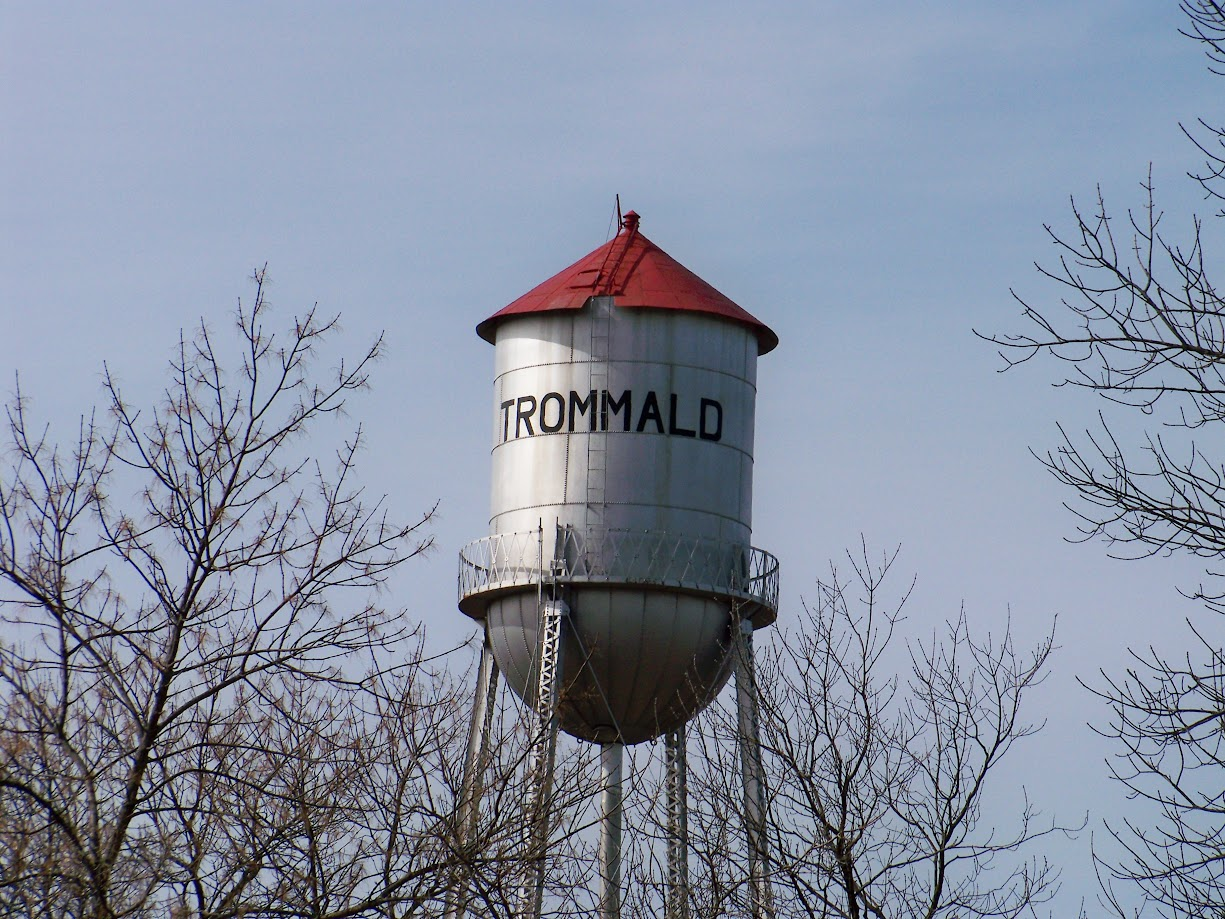
- Trommald Water Tower, part of NRHP

- Location of Trommald within Crow Wing County, Minnesota
- Coordinates: 46°30′23″N 94°01′03″W
- Country: United States
- State: Minnesota
- County: Crow Wing
- Incorporated: August 9, 1917

Government
  - Mayor: Jim Hiller

Area
  - Total: 3.973 sq mi (10.290 km^{2})
  - Land: 3.690 sq mi (9.558 km^{2})
  - Water: 0.281 sq mi (0.727 km^{2})
- Elevation: 1,220 ft (372 m)

Population (2020)
  - Total: 99
  - Estimate (2022): 105
  - Density: 26.8/sq mi (10.36/km^{2})
- Time zone: UTC−6 (Central (CST))
  - Summer (DST): UTC−5 (CDT)
- ZIP Code: 56441
- Area code: 218
- FIPS code: 27-65506
- GNIS feature ID: 2397057
- Sales tax: 7.375%

Trommald is a city in Crow Wing County, Minnesota, United States. The population was 99 at the 2020 census. It is part of the Brainerd Micropolitan Statistical Area.

Trommald was founded as a mining town on the western end of the Cuyuna iron range, just north of Ironton.

== History ==
Trommald was named for A. G. Trommald, county registrar of deeds from 1904 to 1930. Trommald was incorporated in 1917.

== Geography ==
According to the United States Census Bureau, the city has a total area of 3.970 square miles (10.28 km^{2}), of which 3.690 square miles (9.56 km^{2}) is land and 0.281 square miles (0.73 km^{2}) is water. County Roads 30 and 34, and Iverson Road are the main routes in the community.

== Demographics ==
Historical population
Census	Pop.	Note	%±
1920	301		—
1930	242		−19.6%
1940	166		−31.4%
1950	117		−29.5%
1960	101		−13.7%
1970	82		−18.8%
1980	84		2.4%
1990	80		−4.8%
2000	125		56.3%
2010	98		−21.6%
2020	99		1.0%
2022 (est.)	105		6.1%
U.S. Decennial Census; 2020 Census

=== 2010 census ===
As of the 2010 census, there were 98 people, 46 households, and 26 families living in the city. The population density was 26.8 inhabitants per square mile (10.3/km^{2}). There were 55 housing units at an average density of 15.1 per square mile (5.8/km^{2}). The racial makeup of the city was 96.9% White, 2.0% Native American, and 1.0% from two or more races. Hispanic or Latino of any race were 1.0% of the population.

There were 46 households, of which 19.6% had children under the age of 18 living with them, 43.5% were married couples living together, 4.3% had a female householder with no husband present, 8.7% had a male householder with no wife present, and 43.5% were non-families. 30.4% of all households were made up of individuals, and 10.8% had someone living alone who was 65 years of age or older. The average household size was 2.13 and the average family size was 2.65.

The median age in the city was 45 years. 19.4% of residents were under the age of 18; 7.2% were between the ages of 18 and 24; 23.5% were from 25 to 44; 40.8% were from 45 to 64; and 9.2% were 65 years of age or older. The gender makeup of the city was 57.1% male and 42.9% female.

=== 2000 census ===
As of the 2000 census, there were 125 people, 47 households, and 28 families living in the village. The population density was 33.8 inhabitants per square mile (13.1/km^{2}). There were 52 housing units at an average density of 14.0 per square mile (5.4/km^{2}). The racial makeup of the village was 97.60% White, 0.80% Native American, and 1.60% from two or more races. 21.7% were of Norwegian, 12.3% Irish, 10.4% Swedish, 9.4% German, 7.5% French Canadian, 6.6% Italian, 6.6% Polish and 5.7% English ancestry according to Census 2000.

There were 47 households, out of which 38.3% had children under the age of 18 living with them, 53.2% were married couples living together, 2.1% had a female householder with no husband present, and 40.4% were non-families. 31.9% of all households were made up of individuals, and 6.4% had someone living alone who was 65 years of age or older. The average household size was 2.66 and the average family size was 3.50.

In the village the population was spread out, with 31.2% under the age of 18, 8.0% from 18 to 24, 31.2% from 25 to 44, 21.6% from 45 to 64, and 8.0% who were 65 years of age or older. The median age was 34 years. For every 100 females, there were 127.3 males. For every 100 females age 18 and over, there were 126.3 males.

The median income for a household in the village was $21,500, and the median income for a family was $42,083. Males had a median income of $43,333 versus $18,750 for females. The per capita income for the city was $14,714. There were 9.7% of families and 16.0% of the population living below the poverty line, including 8.5% of under eighteens and 18.2% of those over 64.
