= Milford Mine =

Iron-ore mine in Minnesota, US

Milford Mine Disaster
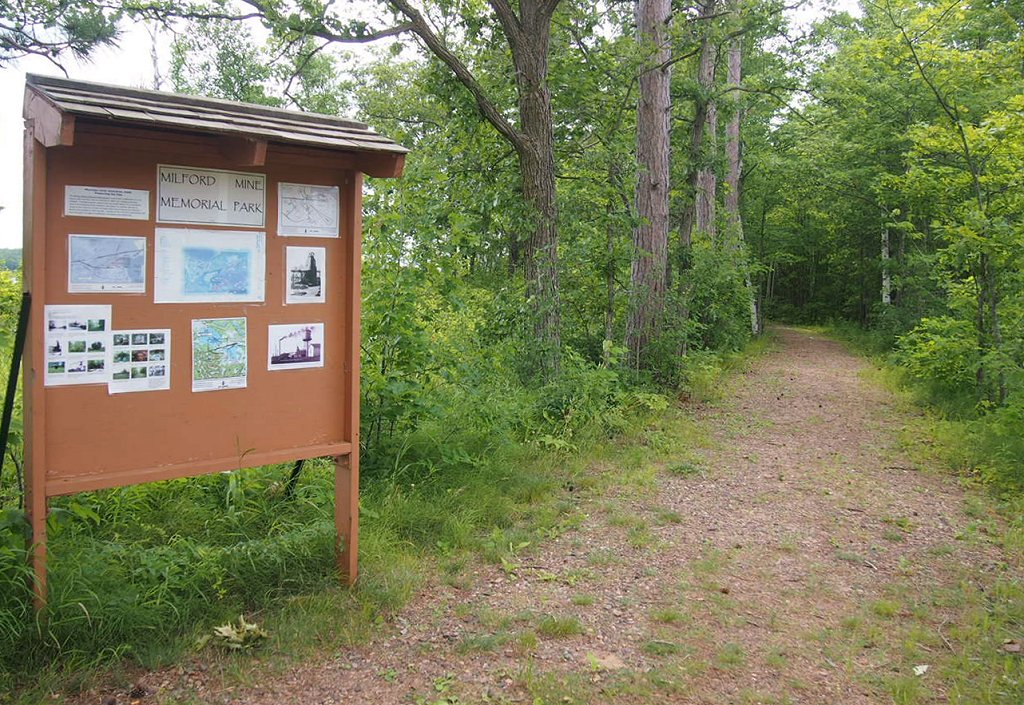
- Entrance to the Milford Mine site
- Date: February 5, 1924
- Location: Milford Mine, Wolford Township, Minnesota
- Casualties: 7 survivors
- Deaths: 41
- Milford Mine Historic District
- U.S. National Register of Historic Places
- U.S. Historic district
- Location within Minnesota Location within the United States
- Coordinates: 46°32′5″N 93°58′15″W
- Area: 180 acres (73 ha)
- Built: 1912–1932
- NRHP reference No.: 11000525
- Designated HD: August 10, 2011

The Milford Mine produced high manganese-content iron ore in Wolford Township, Minnesota, United States. On February 5, 1924, it was the site of the Milford Mine Disaster, the worst mining accident in Minnesota history, when it was flooded by water from a nearby lake, killing 41 miners. Only seven men were able to climb to safety. Starting in 2010, the site has been under development by Crow Wing County as Milford Mine Memorial Park. The property was listed as the Milford Mine Historic District on the National Register of Historic Places in 2011 for its state-level significance in the themes of industry and historical archaeology. It was nominated for its association with a significant event in Minnesota history, and for potential archaeological resources that could illuminate mining technology, the rise and fall of iron-ore mining on the Cuyuna Range, and the daily lives of its workers.

== Background ==
First mined for iron ore in 1917, the Milford Mine reached depths of 200 feet (61 m) by 1924 under its owner George H. Crosby; 70,000 tons of ore were mined and shipped this same year. Manganese ore, an ingredient used to make steel, was shipped from the Milford site to Duluth then to steel factories in cities including Detroit and Cleveland.

== Milford Disaster ==
The disaster occurred when a surface cave-in at the mine's easternmost end tapped into mud that was a direct connection to Foley Lake. In less than 20 minutes the mineshaft flooded to within 15 to 20 feet (4.6 to 6.1 m) of the surface. Seven men made it to ground level, while 41 were overcome by the water or trapped in mud. The last victim's remains were recovered nine months later.

15-year-old Frank Hrvatin Jr., one of the survivors, worked alongside his father Frank Hrvatin Sr. On February 5, Hrvatin Jr. was working with his senior partner Harry Hosford. When they saw the floodwater, they ran for the ladder that ascended 200 feet (61 m) to the surface. Miner Matt Kangas was ahead of them on the ladder. As the water rose and Kangas slowed from the effort of climbing such a distance, Hrvatin climbed between Kangas' legs and propelled the man up the ladder. Hosford was waist-deep in water when Hrvatin reached down and pulled him out of the mine. They were the last three to make it out alive. Frank Hrvatin Sr. was deeper in the mine and did not survive.

=== List of miners lost in the Milford Disaster ===
- Earl Bedard
- Mike Bizal
- Oliver Burns
- George Butkovich
- Emil Carlson
- Valentine Cole
- Evan Crellin
- Roy Cunningham
- Minor Graves
- Clinton A. Harris
- Fred Harte
- John Hendrickson
- John Hlacher
- George Hochever
- Herman Holm
- Elmer Haug
- Frank Hrvatin
- William Johnson
- Alex Jyhla
- Victor Ketola
- Leo J. LaBrash
- Arvid Lehti
- Peter Magdich
- Henry Maki
- John Maurich
- Ronald McDonald
- Arthur Myhres
- John Minerich
- Nick Radich
- Clyde Revord
- Gaspar H. Revord
- Nels Ritari
- Jerome Ryan
- Tony Slack
- Joseph Snyder
- Marko Toljan
- Mike Tomac
- Martin Valencich
- Arthur Wolford
- John Yaklich
- Fred Zeitz

== Aftermath ==
Thirty-eight of the 41 miners who drowned were married, leaving behind more than 80 children.

Recovery efforts were both delicate and dangerous, as the mine was filled with mud and debris. Further, workers worried about potential cave-ins. It took months to recover the men's bodies. The last body was removed on November 9. The mine resumed operations soon after that.

Minnesota governor J. A. O. Preus appointed a five-man committee to investigate the disaster, which held hearings in May and June. Its final report said: "No blame can be attached to the mining company for this unfortunate accident. The real cause of the disaster was the fact that imminence and danger from such a rush of mud was not recognized by anyone."

The mine closed in 1932 due to the decline in demand for steel during the Great Depression.

== See also ==
- National Register of Historic Places listings in Crow Wing County, Minnesota
