= Wolford Township, Crow Wing County, Minnesota =

Township in Minnesota, United States

Wolford Township
- Township
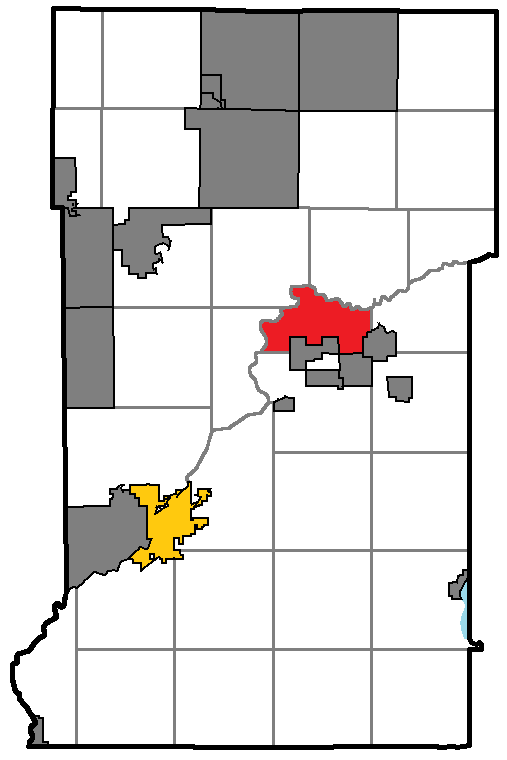
- Location of Wolford Township, within Crow Wing County, Minnesota
- Coordinates: 46°31′41″N 93°58′50″W
- Country: United States
- State: Minnesota
- County: Crow Wing

Area
  - Total: 17.0 sq mi (44.0 km^{2})
  - Land: 14.6 sq mi (37.8 km^{2})
  - Water: 2.4 sq mi (6.1 km^{2})
- Elevation: 1,250 ft (380 m)

Population (2020)
  - Total: 348
  - Density: 23.8/sq mi (9.21/km^{2})
- Time zone: UTC-6 (Central (CST))
  - Summer (DST): UTC-5 (CDT)
- FIPS code: 27-71374
- GNIS feature ID: 0666036

Wolford Township is a township in Crow Wing County, Minnesota, United States. The population was 348 at the 2020 census. Wolford Township was named for Richard Wolford, an early settler.

== Geography ==
According to the United States Census Bureau, the township has a total area of 17.0 square miles (44.0 km^{2}), of which 14.6 square miles (37.8 km^{2}) is land and 2.4 square miles (6.1 km^{2}) (13.91%) is water.

== Demographics ==
As of the census of 2000, there were 326 people, 124 households, and 103 families residing in the township. The population density was 22.3 people per square mile (8.6/km^{2}). There were 217 housing units at an average density of 14.9/sq mi (5.7/km^{2}). The racial makeup of the township was 97.24% White, 0.61% Native American, 0.61% Pacific Islander, and 1.53% from two or more races. Hispanic or Latino of any race were 0.92% of the population.

There were 124 households, out of which 31.5% had children under the age of 18 living with them, 70.2% were married couples living together, 6.5% had a female householder with no husband present, and 16.9% were non-families. 13.7% of all households were made up of individuals, and 3.2% had someone living alone who was 65 years of age or older. The average household size was 2.63 and the average family size was 2.87.

In the township the population was spread out, with 25.2% under the age of 18, 6.4% from 18 to 24, 24.8% from 25 to 44, 29.8% from 45 to 64, and 13.8% who were 65 years of age or older. The median age was 41 years. For every 100 females, there were 111.7 males. For every 100 females age 18 and over, there were 115.9 males.

The median income for a household in the township was $50,833, and the median income for a family was $50,625. Males had a median income of $36,750 versus $26,563 for females. The per capita income for the township was $17,179. About 3.6% of families and 6.7% of the population were below the poverty line, including 8.5% of those under age 18 and none of those age 65 or over.
