= Ironton, Minnesota =

City in Minnesota, United States

Ironton
- City
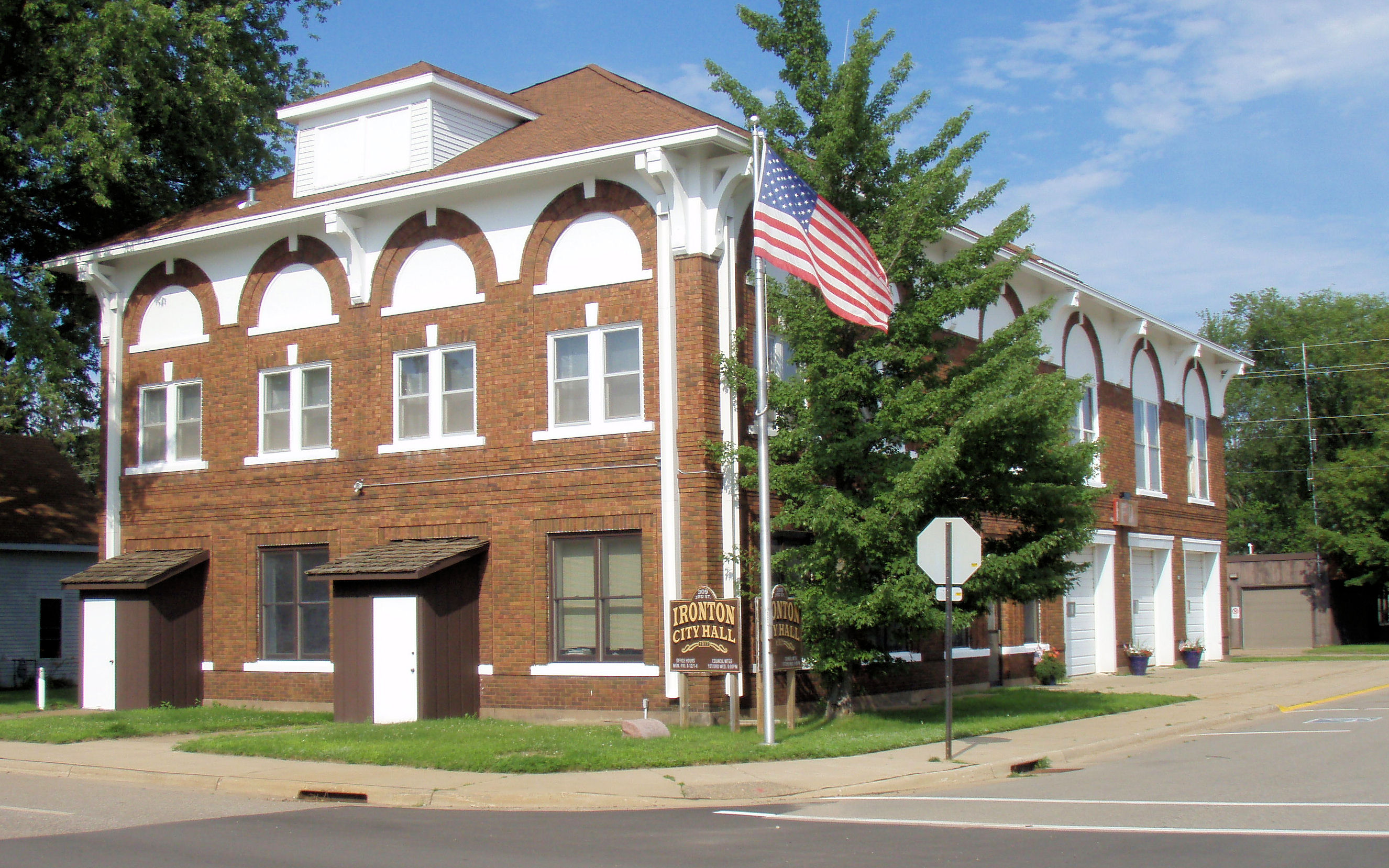
- Ironton City Hall

- Location of Ironton within Crow Wing County, Minnesota
- Coordinates: 46°28′54″N 94°00′00″W
- Country: United States
- State: Minnesota
- County: Crow Wing

Area
  - Total: 2.14 sq mi (5.53 km^{2})
  - Land: 1.45 sq mi (3.75 km^{2})
  - Water: 0.69 sq mi (1.78 km^{2})
- Elevation: 1,181 ft (360 m)

Population (2020)
  - Total: 576
  - Density: 397.8/sq mi (153.61/km^{2})
- Time zone: UTC-6 (Central (CST))
  - Summer (DST): UTC-5 (CDT)
- ZIP code: 56455
- Area code: 218
- FIPS code: 27-31274
- GNIS feature ID: 2395439
- Website: https://cityofironton.org/

Ironton is a city in Crow Wing County, Minnesota, United States. As of the 2020 census, Ironton had a population of 576. It is part of the Brainerd Micropolitan Statistical Area.

Ironton is located on the Cuyuna iron range, from which its name is derived. It is immediately adjacent to its twin city of Crosby.

== History ==
Ironton was platted in September 1910, and was incorporated in June 1911. The post office at Ironton was established in 1910.

== Geography ==
According to the United States Census Bureau, the city has a total area of 2.00 square miles (5.18 km^{2}), of which 1.48 square miles (3.83 km^{2}) is land and 0.52 square miles (1.35 km^{2}) is water. Minnesota State Highway 210 and County Road 30 are the main routes in the community.

== Demographics ==
Historical population
Census	Pop.	Note	%±
1920	1,165		—
1930	1,033		−11.3%
1940	827		−19.9%
1950	828		0.1%
1960	724		−12.6%
1970	562		−22.4%
1980	537		−4.4%
1990	553		3.0%
2000	498		−9.9%
2010	572		14.9%
2020	576		0.7%
U.S. Decennial Census

=== 2010 census ===
As of the census of 2010, there were 572 people, 261 households, and 135 families living in the city. The population density was 386.5 inhabitants per square mile (149.2/km^{2}). There were 299 housing units at an average density of 202.0 per square mile (78.0/km^{2}). The racial makeup of the city was 95.8% White, 1.0% Native American, 0.3% Asian, 0.2% Pacific Islander, 0.3% from other races, and 2.3% from two or more races. Hispanic or Latino of any race were 1.2% of the population.

There were 261 households, of which 28.4% had children under the age of 18 living with them, 32.6% were married couples living together, 11.9% had a female householder with no husband present, 7.3% had a male householder with no wife present, and 48.3% were non-families. 41.0% of all households were made up of individuals, and 19.2% had someone living alone who was 65 years of age or older. The average household size was 2.19 and the average family size was 3.00.

The median age in the city was 36.7 years. 27.8% of residents were under the age of 18; 6.8% were between the ages of 18 and 24; 22.7% were from 25 to 44; 25.3% were from 45 to 64; and 17.3% were 65 years of age or older. The gender makeup of the city was 47.7% male and 52.3% female.

=== 2000 census ===
As of the census of 2000, there were 498 people, 231 households, and 130 families living in the city. The population density was 333.2 inhabitants per square mile (128.6/km^{2}). There were 263 housing units at an average density of 176.0 per square mile (68.0/km^{2}). The racial makeup of the city was 99.40% White, 0.40% Native American, and 0.20% from two or more races. 46.8% were of American, 9.5% German, 9.5% Swedish, 8.6% Norwegian and 5.9% Irish ancestry according to Census 2000.

There were 231 households, out of which 26.4% had children under the age of 18 living with them, 42.4% were married couples living together, 9.1% had a female householder with no husband present, and 43.7% were non-families. 39.8% of all households were made up of individuals, and 26.4% had someone living alone who was 65 years of age or older. The average household size was 2.16 and the average family size was 2.88.

In the city, the population was spread out, with 27.1% under the age of 18, 6.8% from 18 to 24, 22.9% from 25 to 44, 17.7% from 45 to 64, and 25.5% who were 65 years of age or older. The median age was 40 years. For every 100 females, there were 81.1 males. For every 100 females age 18 and over, there were 75.4 males.

The median income for a household in the city was $22,813, and the median income for a family was $30,729. Males had a median income of $27,222 versus $17,143 for females. The per capita income for the city was $12,949. About 13.7% of families and 17.5% of the population were below the poverty line, including 16.5% of those under age 18 and 23.5% of those age 65 or over.
