= Cuyuna Range =

Iron mining range in northern Minnesota

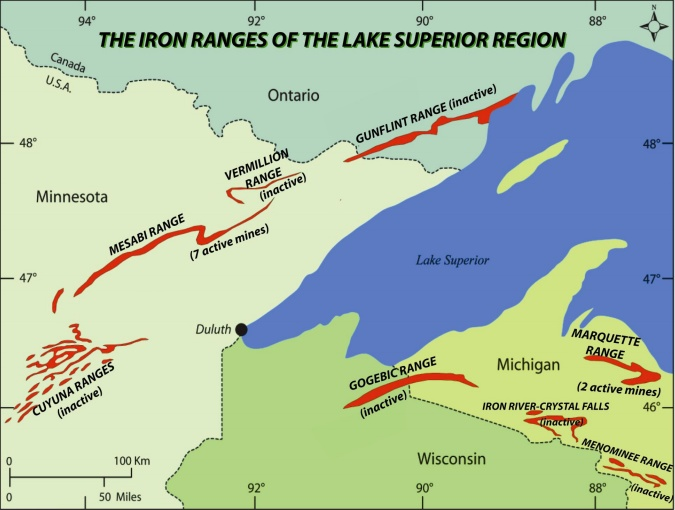
Lake Superior Iron Ranges

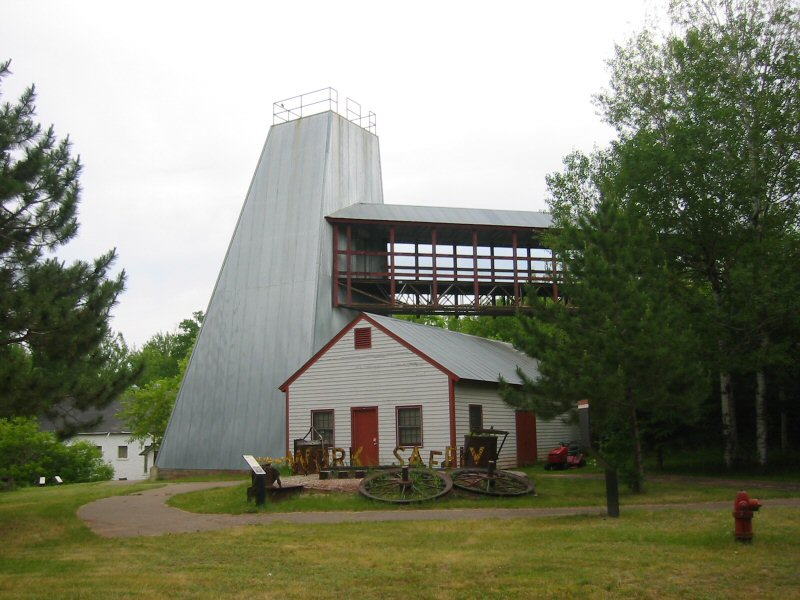
The Croft Mine Historical Park in Crosby, Minnesota preserves the headframe and railroad bridge.

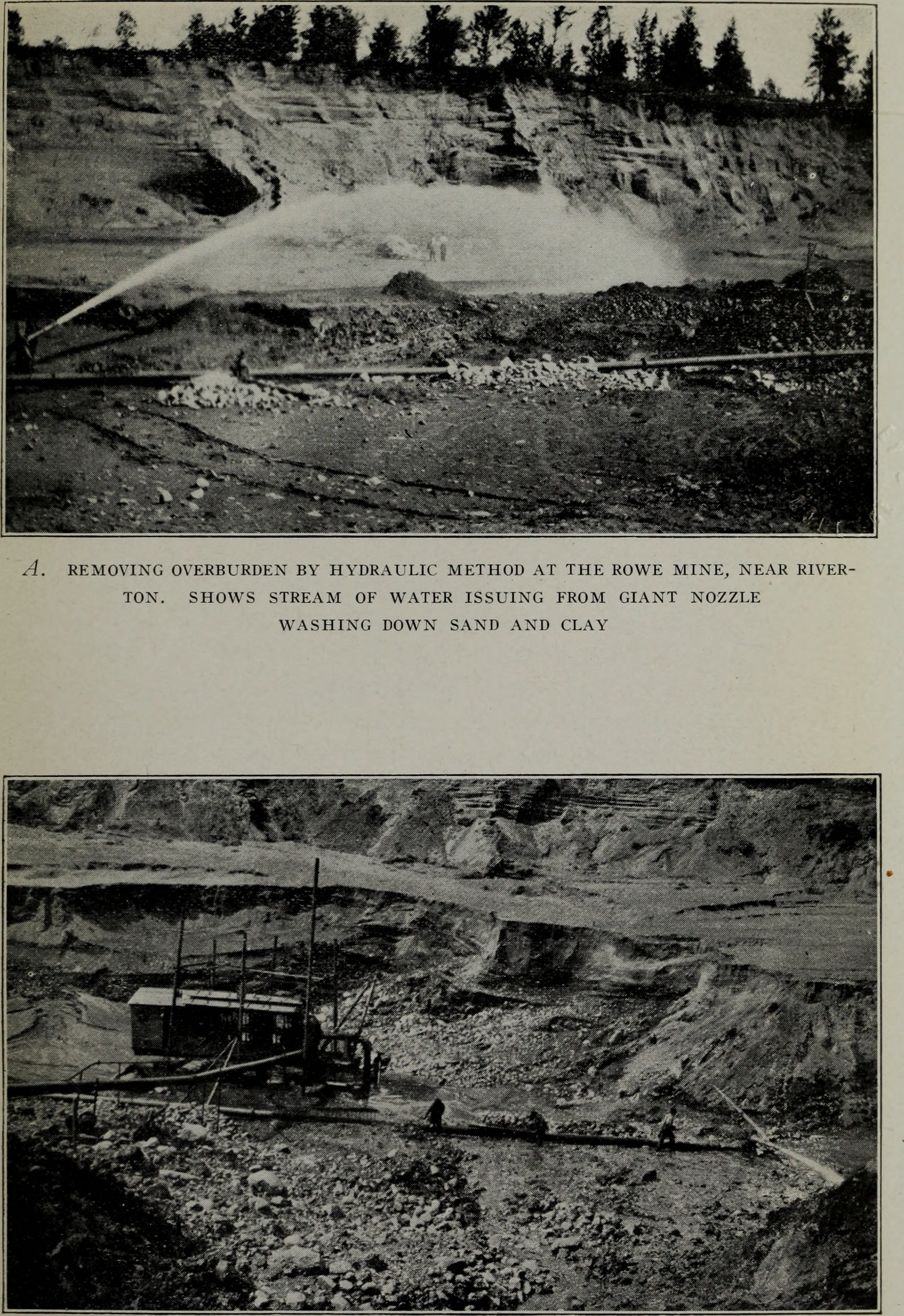
Cuyuna iron-ore district (1918)

The Cuyuna Range (/kaɪˈjunə/ kye-YOO-nə) is an inactive iron range to the southwest of the Mesabi Range, largely within Crow Wing County, Minnesota. It lies along a 68-mile-long (109 km) line between Brainerd, Minnesota, and Aitkin, Minnesota. The width ranges from 1 to 10 miles (1.6 to 16 km).

== Discovery ==
Though covered by Pleistocene glacial drift up to 200 feet thick, 1859 surveyors noted compass deflection while in the area. The range was surveyed by Cuyler Adams, using a dip needle in 1895. With partners, he located ore by drilling in 1903. The word "Cuyuna" is an amalgamation of the first three letters of Cuyler's name with "Una", the name of his dog.

The Kennedy mine shaft reached ore in April 1908 and the first shipment was made via rail on 11 April 1911. Open pit mining started at the Rowe mine in 1912. In addition to the iron, the ore was rich in manganese, which was useful during World War I, with 32 mines operating.

At the height of the mining, the Cuyuna Range was the location of the worst mining disaster in Minnesota, the Milford Mine disaster. On February 5, 1924, a new tunnel was blasted too close to nearby Foley Lake, and water rushed in, killing 41 miners.

Mining on the range continued until 1984. Also like the Vermilion Range, mining slowed as it became more economical to extract taconite deposits from the Mesabi Range, which were closer to the surface. Additionally, the surface mines were safer than the mines deep underground.

Cuyuna Country State Recreation Area now occupies portions of the range where mining pits and rock deposit stockpiles were left behind by the miners. The Cuyuna Lakes Trail is also located near the former mines.

== Geology ==
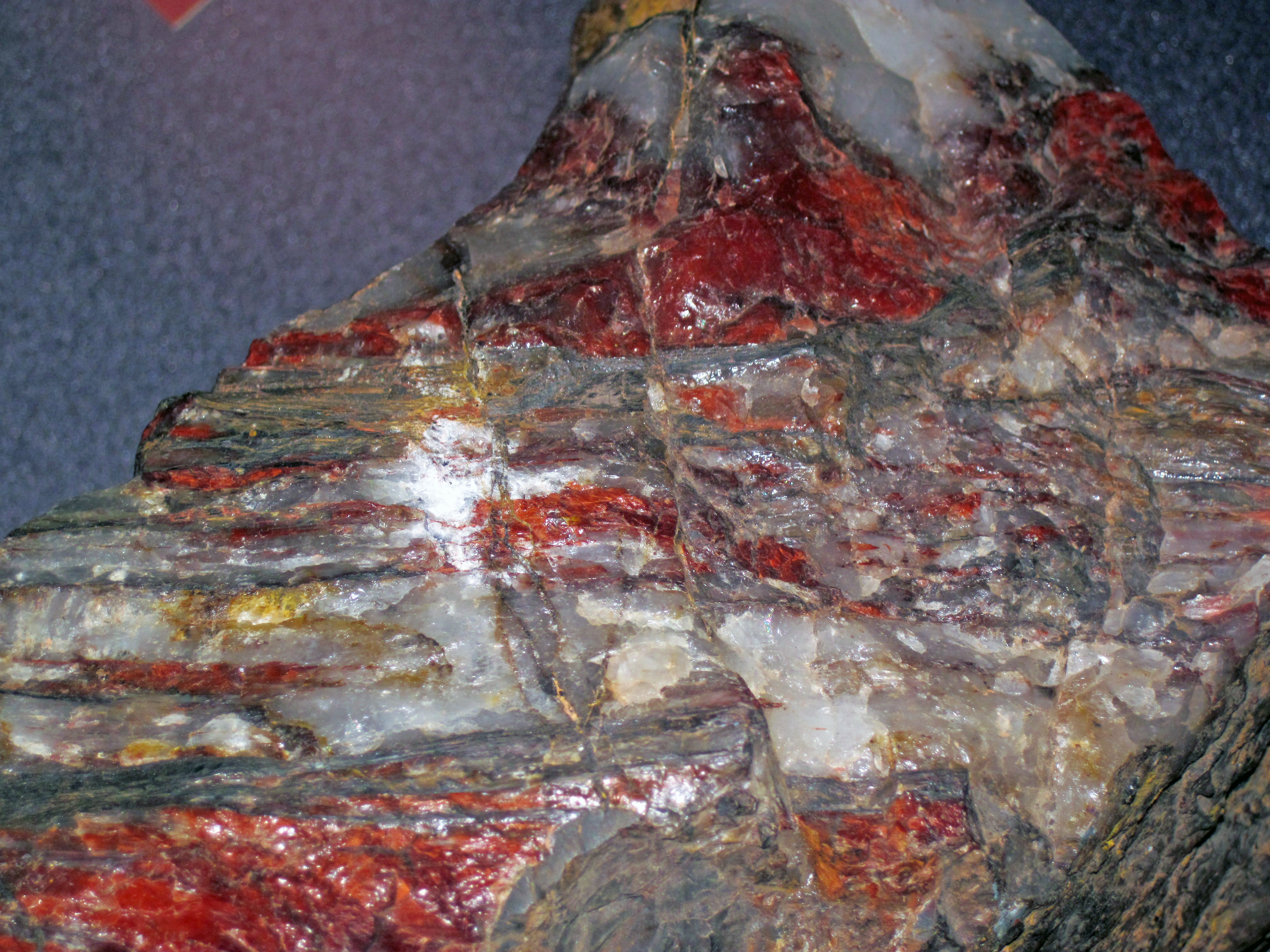
Binghamite, Cuyuna North Range, Minnesota, USA

The rocks in the district consist of tightly folded layers parallel to the axis of the Lake Superior Syncline. These folds trend to the northeast. The rocks have been slightly metamorphosed.

The main iron ore bearing formation is the middle Precambrian Trommald Formation, which belongs in the Animikie Group. This is a chert containing oxidized iron in the form of hematite and goethite. Some clastic quartz sands and argillaceous layers. The agate variant Binghamite is found only in the Cuyuna Range.

== Communities ==
- Cuyuna, Minnesota
- Crosby, Minnesota
- Ironton, Minnesota
- Trommald, Minnesota
- Riverton, Minnesota
- Manganese, Minnesota

== See also ==
- Mesabi Range
- Gogebic Range
- Vermilion Range (Minnesota)
- Gunflint Range
- Marquette Iron Range
- Banded iron formation
