= Luch =

Luch may refer to:

== Places ==
- Luch (landform), an area of originally expansive, boggy lowland in northeast Germany
- Luch (rural locality), several rural localities in Russia

Ukraine

- Luch, Mykolaiv Oblast, village in Mykolaiv Raion
- Luch, Sumy Oblast, village in Konotop Raion

== Others ==
- Luch (newspaper), a Menshevik daily newspaper in Russia, published from 1912 to 1913
- Luch (satellite), a series of Russian relay satellites
- Luch (watchmaker), a watch company and brand in Minsk, Belarus
- Luch Design Bureau, Ukrainian weapons manufacturer
- Luch Stadium, a stadium in Gomel, Belarus

== See also ==
- FC Luch-Energiya Vladivostok, a soccer team based in Vladivostok, Russia
- Luchs (disambiguation)
- Krasnyi Luch
