= Luch (rural locality) =

Luch (Russian: Луч) is the name of several rural localities in Russia.

- Luch, Birsky District, Republic of Bashkortostan, a khutor in Staropetrovsky Selsoviet of Birsky District in the Republic of Bashkortostan
- Luch, Zianchurinsky District, Republic of Bashkortostan, a village in Tazlarovsky Selsoviet of Zianchurinsky District in the Republic of Bashkortostan
- Luch, Krasnodar Krai, a settlement in Luchevoy Rural Okrug of Labinsky District in Krasnodar Krai
- Luch, Moscow Oblast, a settlement in Stremilovskoye Rural Settlement of Chekhovsky District in Moscow Oblast
- Luch, Nizhny Novgorod Oblast, a settlement under the administrative jurisdiction of Prioksky City District of the city of oblast significance of Nizhny Novgorod in Nizhny Novgorod Oblast
- Luch, Orenburg Oblast, a settlement in Pylayevsky Selsoviet of Pervomaysky District in Orenburg Oblast
- Luch, Penza Oblast, a settlement in Troitsky Selsoviet of Bashmakovsky District in Penza Oblast
- Luch, Saratov Oblast, a settlement in Rtishchevsky District of Saratov Oblast
- Luch, Bogdanovichsky District, Sverdlovsk Oblast, a settlement in Bogdanovichsky District of Sverdlovsk Oblast
- Luch, Sysertsky District, Sverdlovsk Oblast, a settlement in Sysertsky District of Sverdlovsk Oblast
- Luch, Tambov Oblast, a settlement in Luchevsky Selsoviet of Uvarovsky District in Tambov Oblast
- Luch, Republic of Tatarstan, a settlement in Chistopolsky District of the Republic of Tatarstan
- Luch, Vladimir Oblast, a settlement in Alexandrovsky District of Vladimir Oblast
- Luch, Voronezh Oblast, a settlement in Usmanskoye 2-ye Rural Settlement of Novousmansky District in Voronezh Oblast
