= Luchs =

Luchs (German for Lynx) may refer to:

== Military ==
- Luchs (tank), a light reconnaissance model of the Panzer II World War II German tank
- Spähpanzer Luchs, a German amphibious reconnaissance vehicle in service from 1975 to 2009
- SMS Luchs, an Imperial German gunboat commissioned in 1900
- German torpedo boat Luchs, commissioned in 1929

== Other uses ==
- Ernst Luchs (1811–1886), German physician and naturalist
- Jürg Luchs (born 1956), Swiss cyclist
- Luchs, a character from Saber Marionette J

== See also ==
- Luch (disambiguation)
- Lux (disambiguation)
