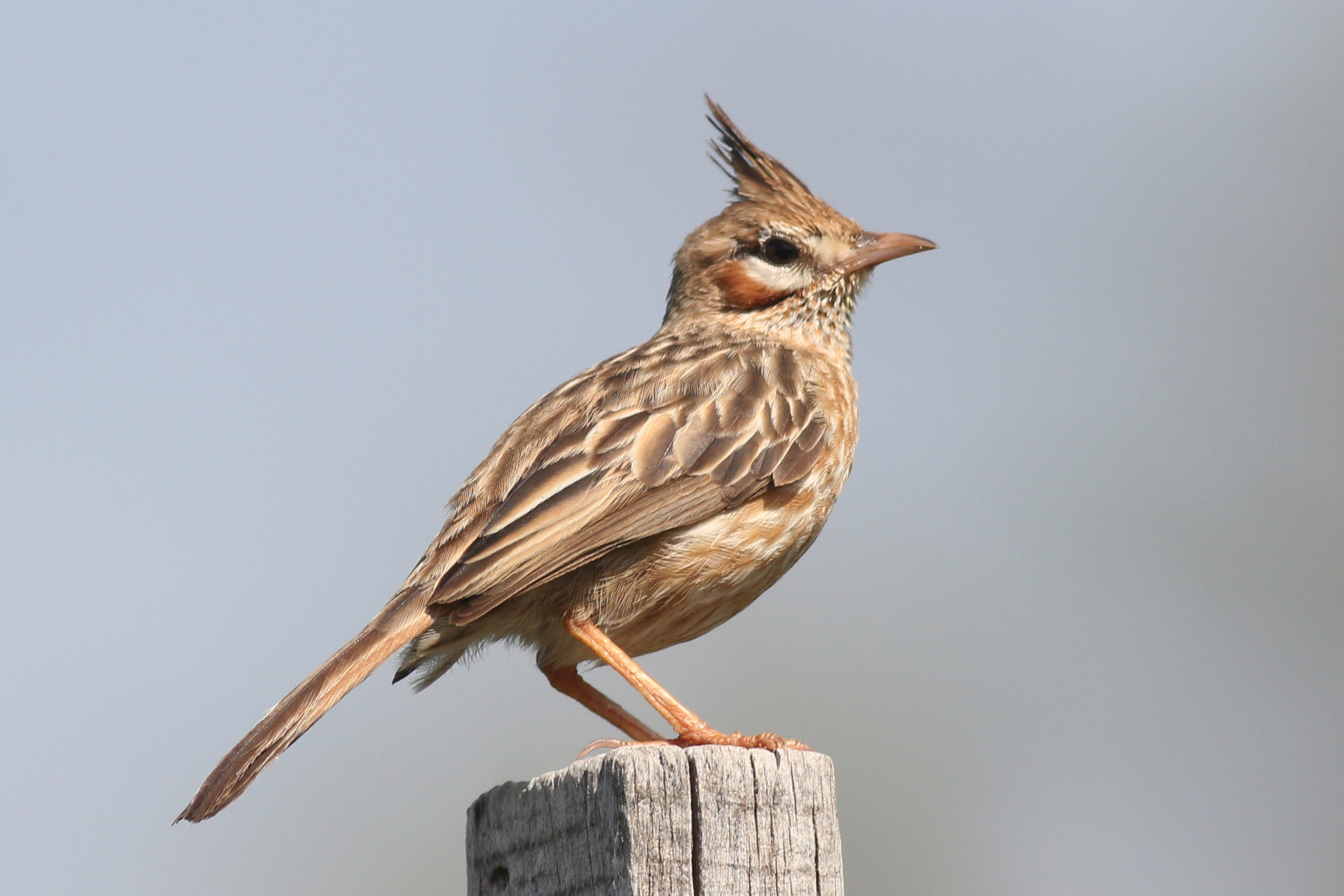
- In Argentina

Conservation status
- Least Concern (IUCN 3.1)

Scientific classification
- Kingdom: Animalia
- Phylum: Chordata
- Class: Aves
- Order: Passeriformes
- Family: Furnariidae
- Genus: Coryphistera; Burmeister, 1860
- Species: C. alaudina

Binomial name
- Coryphistera alaudina Burmeister, 1860

= Lark-like brushrunner =

Species of bird

The lark-like brushrunner (Coryphistera alaudina) is a species of bird in the Furnariinae subfamily of the ovenbird family Furnariidae. It is found in Argentina, Bolivia, Brazil, Paraguay, and Uruguay.

== Taxonomy and systematics ==
The lark-like brushrunner is genetically most closely related to the firewood-gatherer (Anumbius annumbi), and they may be sister species. The lark-like brushrunner is the only member of its genus and has two subspecies, the nominate C. a. alaudina (Burmeister, 1860) and C. a. campicola (Todd, 1915).

== Description ==
The lark-like brushrunner is 15 to 17 cm (5.9 to 6.7 in) long and weighs 27 to 42 g (0.95 to 1.5 oz). It is an unusual furnariid that, as its name implies, resembles a lark with an erect crest. The sexes have the same plumage. Adults of the nominate subspecies have white around their eye that extends onto the ear coverts that are otherwise cinnamon-rufous. Their lores are dull brownish. Their forehead is rufescent brownish and their crown and crest very dark brown. Their back is pale dull brown with vague darker streaks on the upper part that become wider and darker on the lower back, rump, and uppertail coverts. Their crown has narrow blackish streaks that almost disappear on the hindneck and upper back but then become longer and wider on the lower back. Their wing coverts are dark fuscous brown, their primary coverts blackish, and their flight feathers blackish with rufescent inner edges and pale buff outer edges. Their tail's central pair of feathers are dark fuscous brown with buff edges; the rest are mostly rufous with progressively less dark fuscous brown on their edges to the outermost. Their chin and throat are whitish with dull rufous streaks on the latter. Their breast is whitish with wide blurry rufous streaks that fade and become browner on the upper belly, flanks, and undertail coverts; the belly's center is mostly unstreaked. Their iris is dark brown to light grayish brown, their maxilla browish to pinkish brown (usually with a darker tip), their mandible pinkish gray to yellow-brown (sometimes with a darker tip), and their legs and feet dull orange to grayish tan to light brown. Juveniles have a shorter crest and less distinct streaks than adults. Subspecies C. a. campicola has some pale rufous edges at the base of the crest feathers, and more buff edging on the upperparts' feathers and paler streaks on the underparts than the nominate.

== Distribution and habitat ==
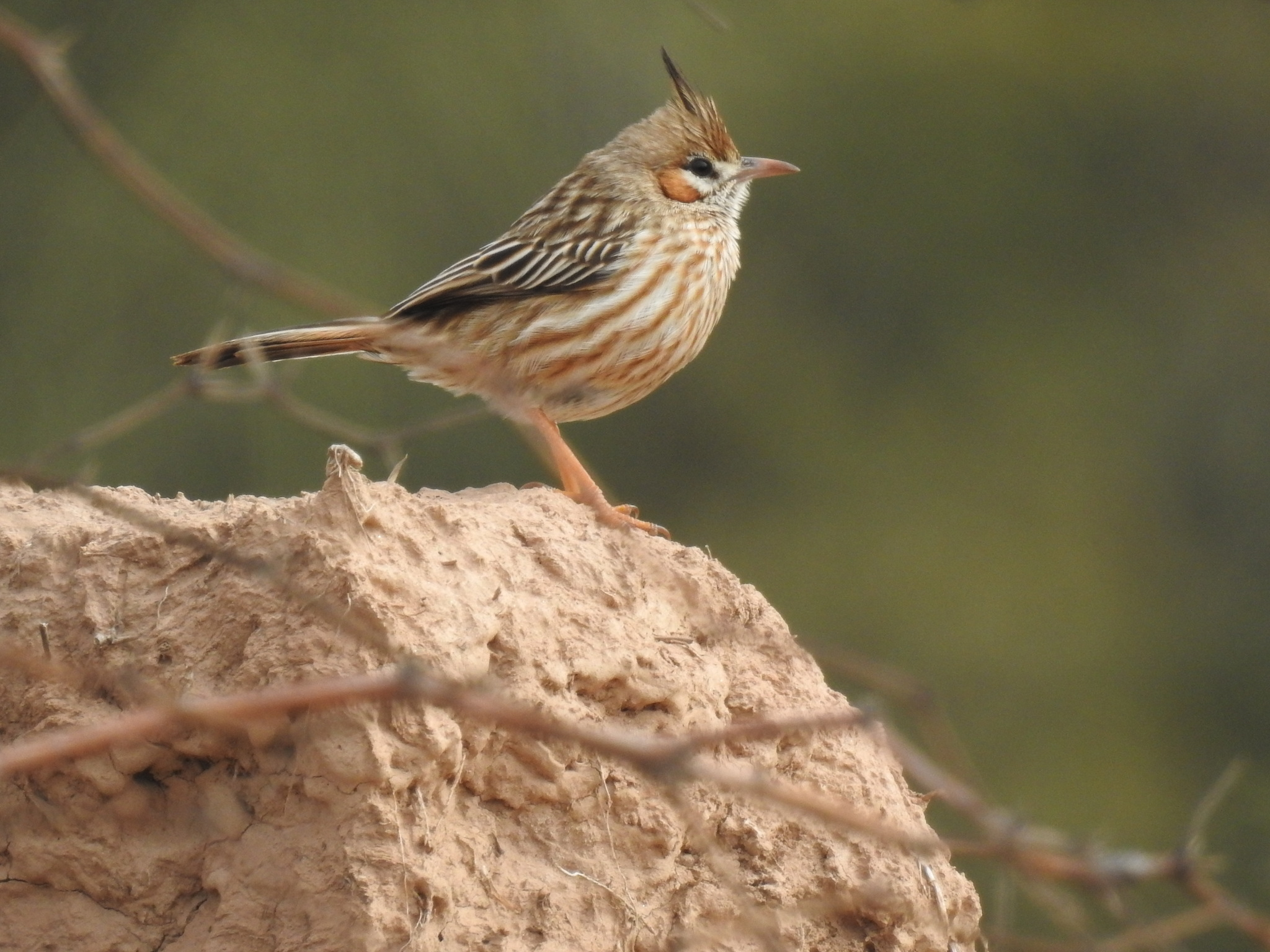
In Argentina

The nominate subspecies of the lark-like brushrunner is the more widespread of the two. It is found in southern Bolivia, northern and eastern Argentina, northwestern Uruguay, and slightly into the southernmost Brazilian state of Rio Grande do Sul. Subspecies C. a. campicola is found in southeastern Bolivia and western Paraguay.

The species inhabits open to semi-open landscapes including arid lowland scrublands, arid Gran Chaco woodlands, savanna, pastures with trees, and to a lesser extent agricultural fields. In elevation it ranges from near sea level to 500 m (1,600 ft).

== Behavior ==
=== Movement ===
The lark-like brushrunner is mostly a year-round resident throughout its range but some of the southernmost move north in the austral winter.

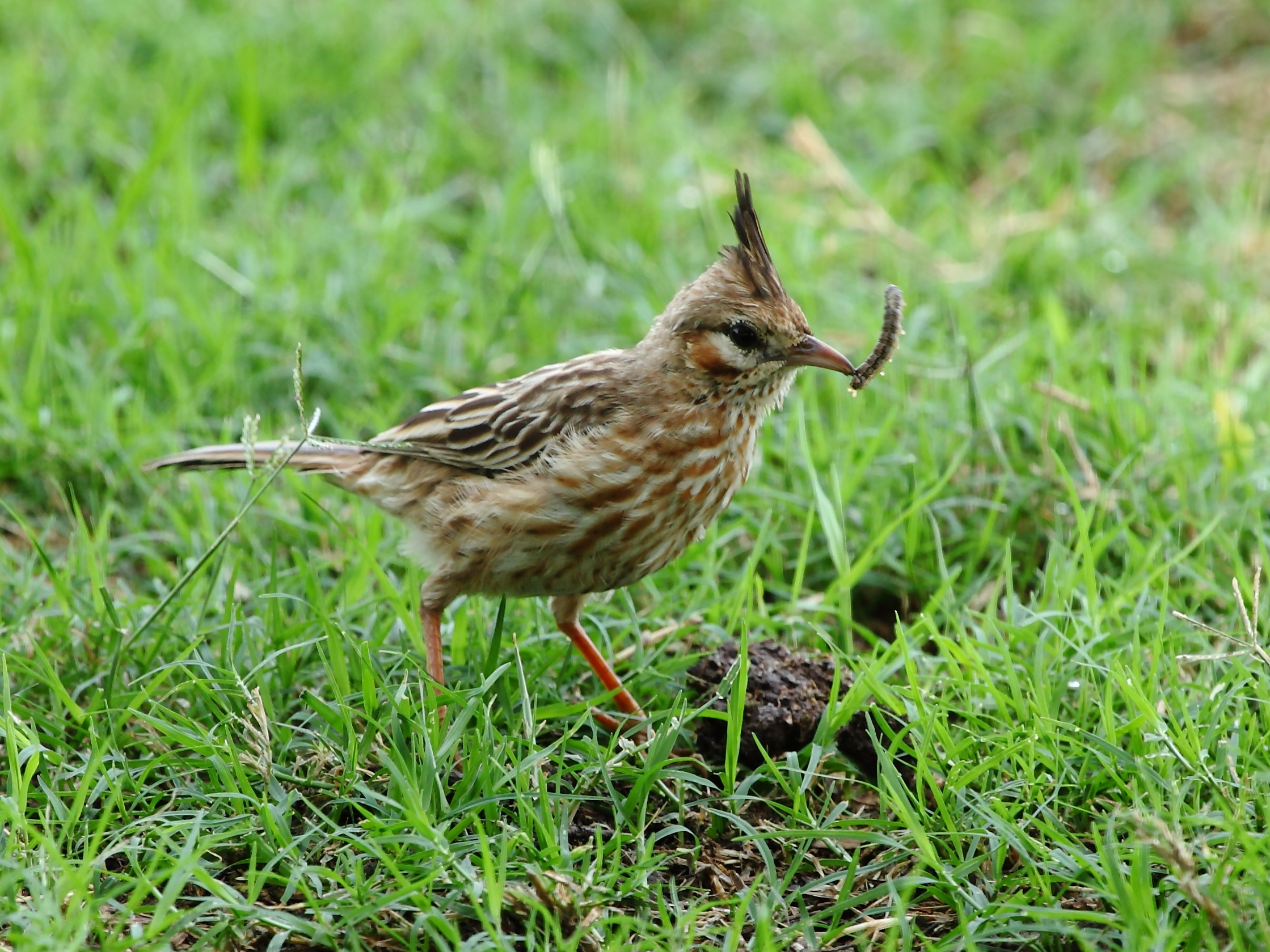
Feeding on a caterpillar

=== Feeding ===
The lark-like brushrunner feeds mostly on arthropods; it also feeds on snails. During the breeding season if forages in flocks of up to about seven birds; outside that season the flocks may be as large as 15, and in that season birds join mixed-species feeding flocks. It is mostly terrestrial, gleaning prey while walking along the ground and scratching to expose it. It also tosses mammal dung aside or turns it over.

=== Breeding ===
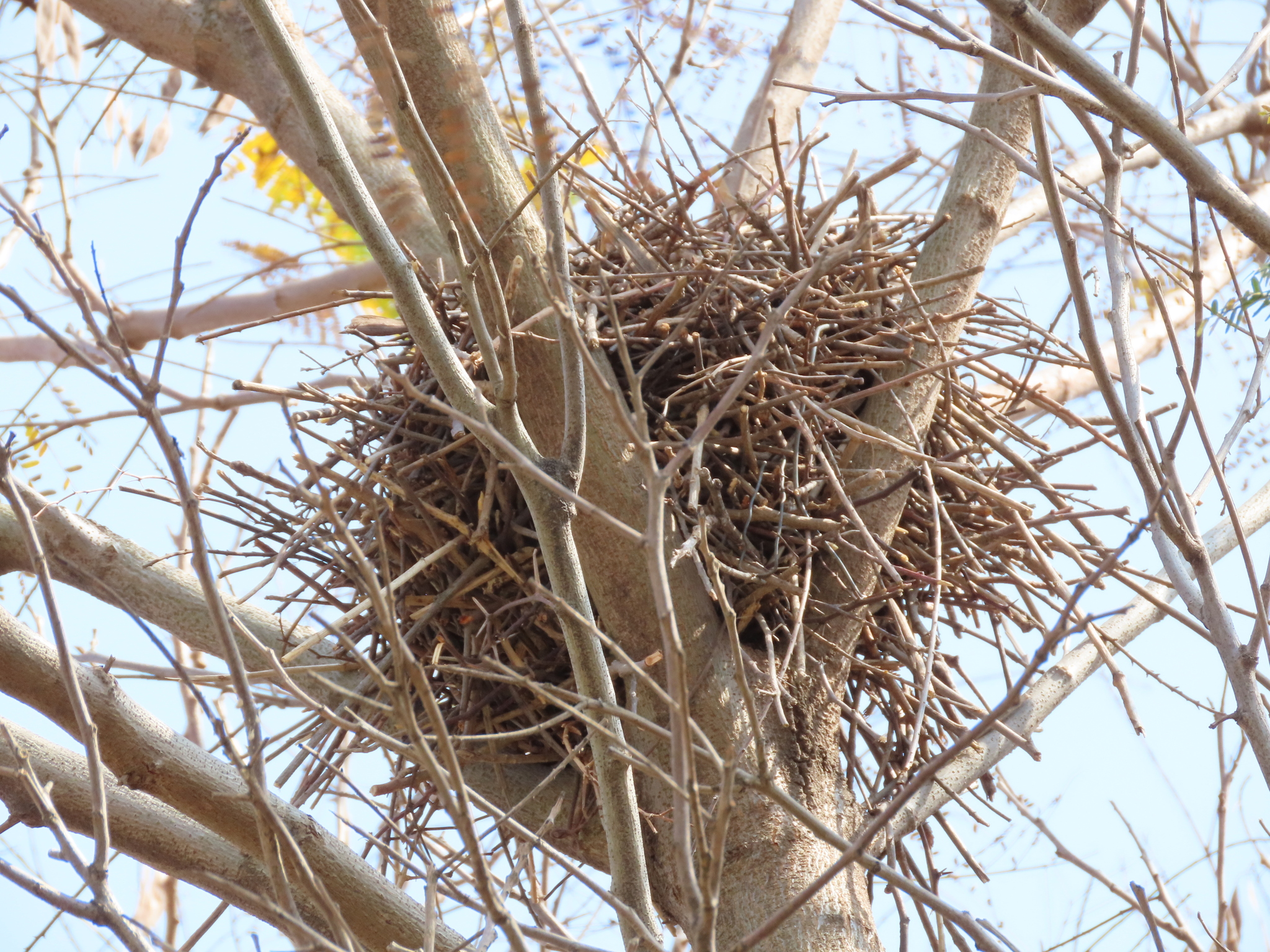
Nest

The lark-like brushrunner breeds in the austral spring and summer, roughly September to January or beyond. It is thought to be monogamous, but observations of groups that do not appear to be nest helpers possibly suggest otherwise. It builds a globular nest up to about 100 cm (39 in) across by weaving thorny sticks and branches. A tunnel leads to a chamber floored with grass and feathers; often the tunnel is "decorated" with butterfly chrysalids, bits of colored glass, and other objects. It is typically placed on a tree branch between 2 and 5 m (7 and 16 ft) above the ground. The nest is similar to that of the monk parakeet and the two have been recording building the same nest to use together, an example of nest sharing and the first time two different species have been observed building a nest together. The usual clutch size is three or four eggs but sometimes five. The incubation period, time to fledging, and details of parental care are not known.

=== Vocalization ===
What is thought to be the lark-like brushrunner's song is "a high-pitched, tremulous, tinkling trill, 'rrrrrew' or 'croe, criiii'". Its calls include a "variety of low buzzy trills and squeaky notes".

== Status ==
The IUCN has assessed the lark-like brushrunner as being of Least Concern. It has a very large range and an unknown population size that is believed to be stable. No immediate threats have been identified.

It is considered fairly common to abundant in much of its range and occurs in several protected areas.
