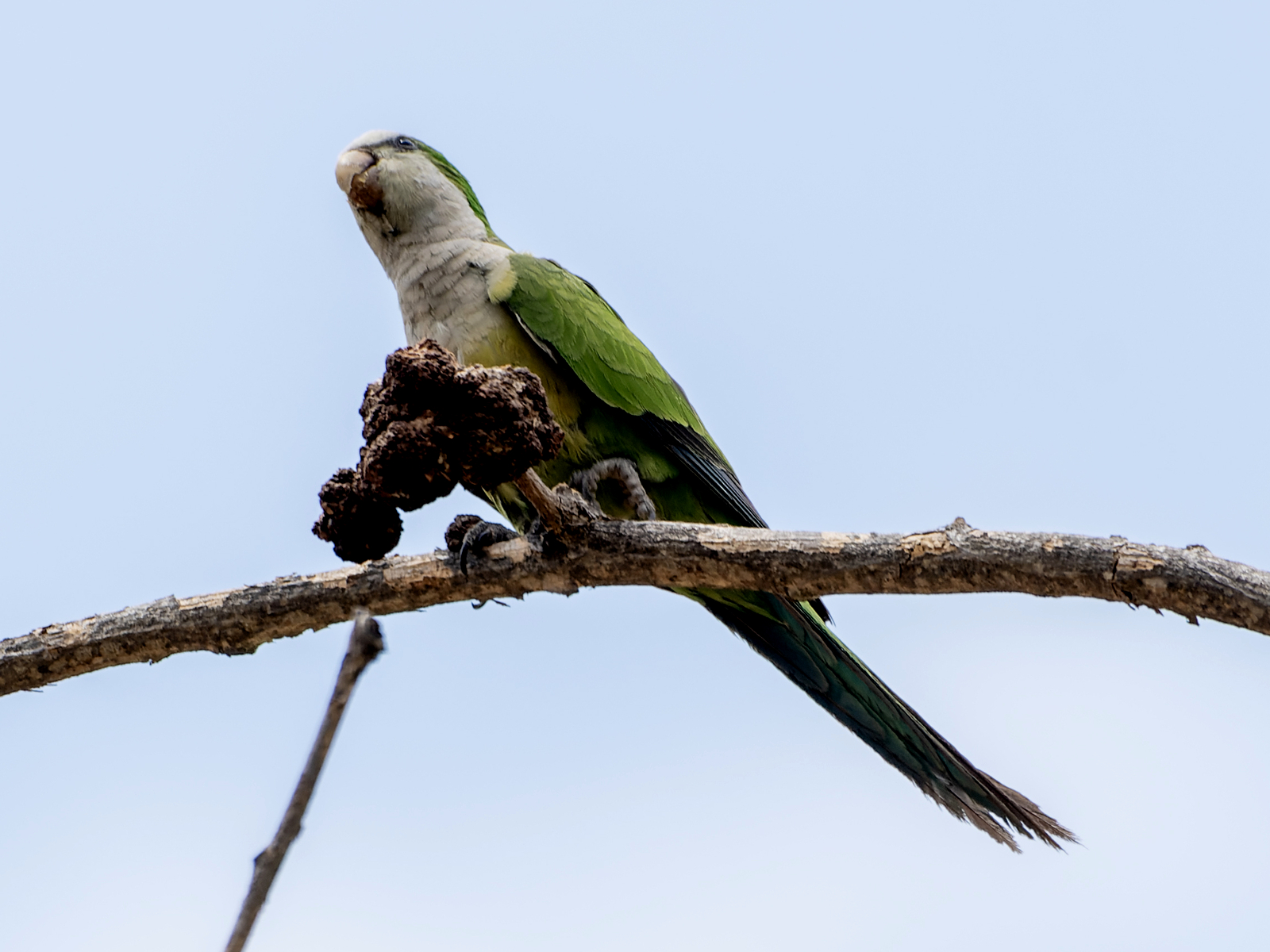
- At Anamal, Santa Cruz, Bolivia

Conservation status
- Near Threatened (IUCN 3.1)

Scientific classification
- Kingdom: Animalia
- Phylum: Chordata
- Class: Aves
- Order: Psittaciformes
- Family: Psittacidae
- Genus: Myiopsitta
- Species: M. luchsi

Binomial name
- Myiopsitta luchsi (Finsch, 1868)

Synonyms
- Bolborrhynchus luchsi Finsch, 1868; Myiopsitta monachus luchsi

= Cliff parakeet =

Species of bird

The cliff parakeet (Myiopsitta luchsi) is a Near Threatened species of bird in subfamily Arinae of the family Psittacidae, the African and New World parrots. It is endemic to Bolivia.

== Taxonomy and systematics ==
The cliff parakeet was long treated as a subspecies of the monk parakeet (Myiopsitta monachus). Due to morphological and behavioral differences, and its geographical disjunction, the International Ornithological Committee elevated the cliff parakeet to species status in 2015. BirdLife International's Handbook of the Birds of the World followed suit in 2020 and the South American Classification Committee of the American Ornithological Society in late 2024. As of late 2024 the Clements taxonomy retains it as a subspecies of monk parakeet.

The species was described by Otto Finsch after the German physician and aviculturist Ernst Luchs.

== Description ==
The cliff parakeet is 30 cm (12 in) long and weighs about 120 g (4.2 oz). Adults have a gray face, throat, and breast and a yellow belly. Their flanks, vent, undertail coverts, and thighs are green. Their hindcrown, nape, and back are various shades of green. Their central tail feathers are dark green to bluish and the rest have green outer webs and yellow inner webs and tips. Their primaries, outer secondaries, and their coverts are blue and the rest of the wing green. Their bill is yellowish brown, sometimes with a rose tinge. Their iris is dark brown and their eye is surrounded by bare gray skin.

The cliff parakeet differs from the monk parakeet by their paler breast color and lack of scaling, they also tend to be more vibrant.

== Distribution and habitat ==
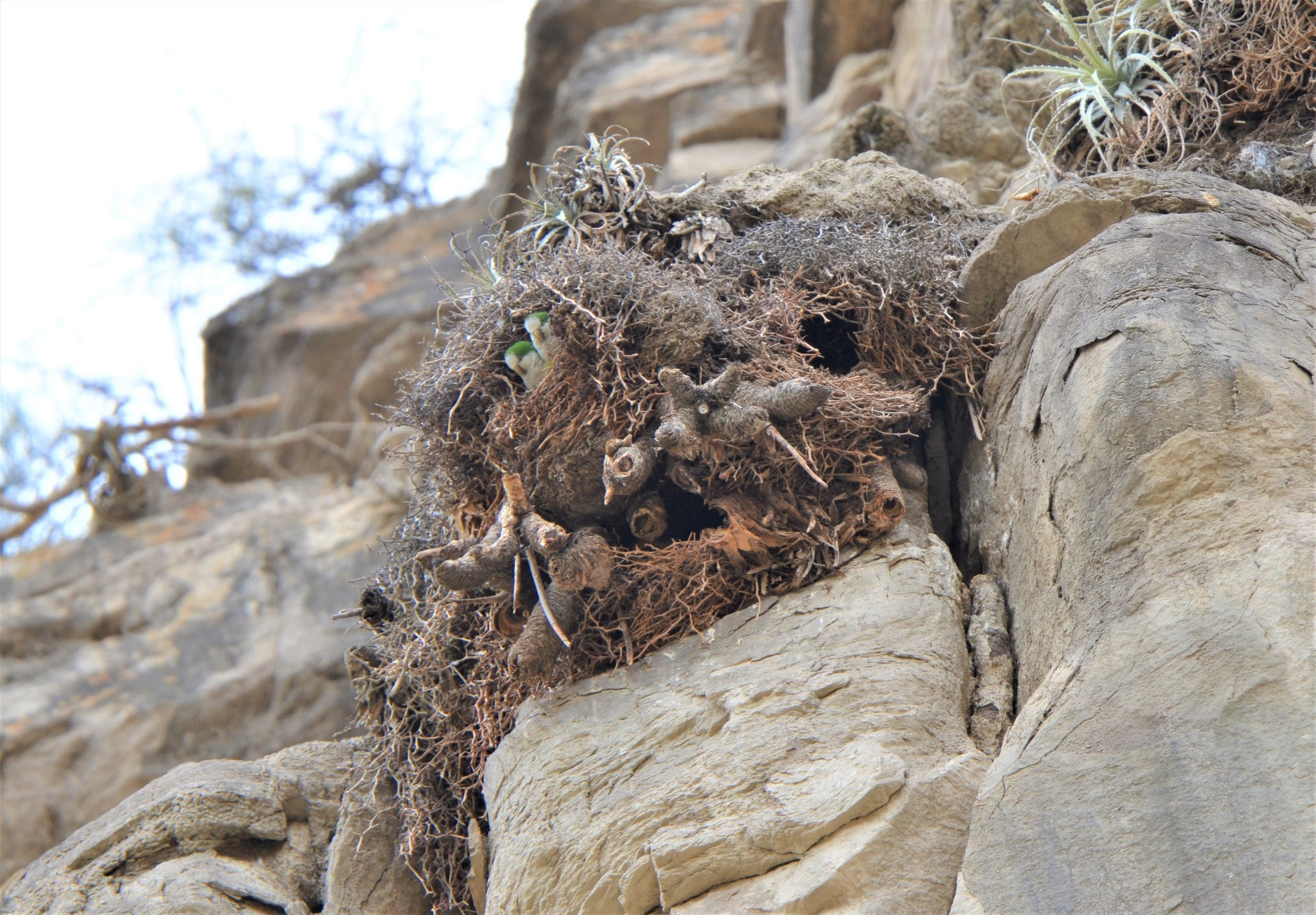
Nest, Tipabañado, Bolivia

The cliff parakeet is found in Bolivia's Chuquisaca, Cochabamba, La Paz, Potosí and Santa Cruz departments and is not believed to migrate. It inhabits dry intermontane valleys where xerophytic vegetation is near cliffs. In elevation it ranges between 1,300 and 3,000 m (4,300 and 9,800 ft).

== Behavior ==
=== Feeding ===
The cliff parakeet's diet is mostly fruits and seeds, notably those of Neoraimondia herzogiana and Acacia furcatispina but also includes maize taken from cultivated fields.

=== Breeding ===
The breeding season lasts from December to March in which the cliff parakeet builds a bulky nest out of sticks on cliffs. Unlike the nests of the monk parakeet, they are not communal, but may be built close together. These two species are the only parrots that do not nest in cavities or burrows. The clutch size is thought to be about six eggs. There is some evidence that two broods are sometimes raised in one year.

== Status ==
The IUCN originally assessed the cliff parakeet as being of Least Concern but since 2021 has rated it Near Threatened. It has a very limited range and its estimated population, of less 10,000 to as low as 2,500 mature individuals, is believed to be decreasing. It does not occur uniformly across its range and is persecuted as a crop pest.
