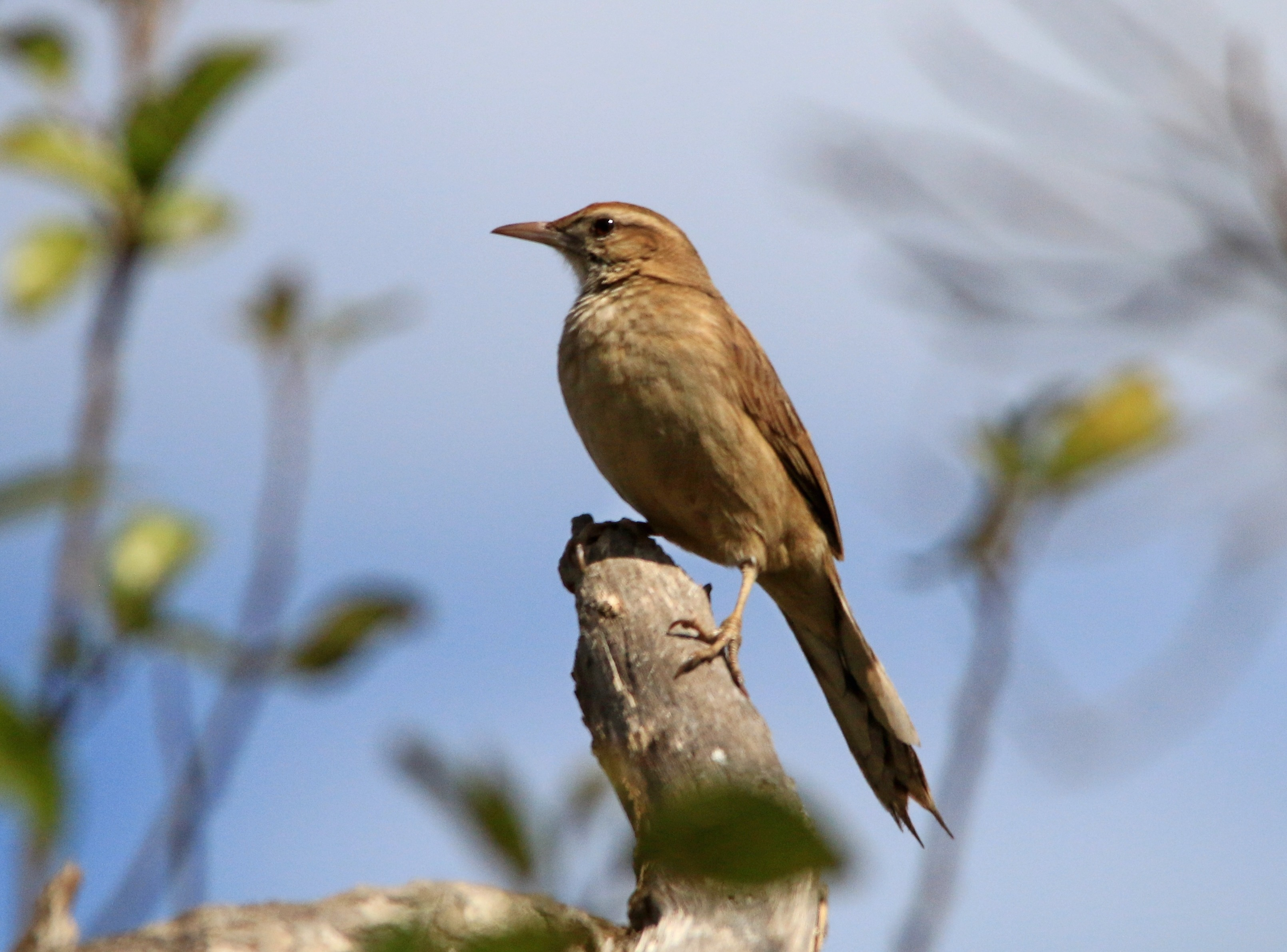

Conservation status
- Least Concern (IUCN 3.1)

Scientific classification
- Kingdom: Animalia
- Phylum: Chordata
- Class: Aves
- Order: Passeriformes
- Family: Furnariidae
- Genus: Anumbius d'Orbigny & Lafresnaye, 1838
- Species: A. annumbi

Binomial name
- Anumbius annumbi (Vieillot, 1817)

= Firewood-gatherer =

Species of bird found in South America

The firewood-gatherer (Anumbius annumbi) is a species of bird in the Furnariinae subfamily of the ovenbird family Furnariidae. It is found in Argentina, Brazil, Paraguay, and Uruguay.

== Taxonomy and systematics ==
The firewood-gatherer is genetically most closely related to the lark-like brushrunner (Coryphistera alaudina), and they may be sister species. The firewood-gatherer is the only member of its genus and is monotypic: no subspecies are recognized.

== Description ==
The firewood-gatherer is 18 to 20 cm (7.1 to 7.9 in) long and weighs 27 to 45 g (0.95 to 1.6 oz). It is an unusual furnariid that somewhat resembles a pipit. The sexes have the same plumage. Adults have a wide whitish supercilium and a medium brownish stripe behind the eye on an otherwise light brownish to grayish brown face. Their forehead is dull rufous and their crown dull brown or sandy brown. Their back is dull brown, their rump dull pale brown, and their uppertail coverts dark brownish with lighter brownish edges. Their crown has narrow blackish streaks that almost disappear on the hindneck and upper back but then become longer and wider on the lower back. Their wings are mostly dull brown with some darker centers on the coverts and darker tips on the flight feathers. Their tail's central pair of feathers are pointed and dark brownish; the rest are less pointed and blackish brown with varying amounts of white near their ends. Their throat is white with a line of black speckles on its side. Their upper breast is a slightly reddish light brown and whitish buff with blurry streaks that fade by the pale buffy belly and undertail coverts. Their flanks are darker sandy brown. Their iris is brown to reddish, their maxilla dull brownish, their mandible gray to light gray with a dark tip, and their legs and feet gray to greenish gray to creamy gray. Juveniles have no rufous on their forehead, an ochraceous throat, and less distinct streaks on the upperparts and darker underparts than adults.

== Distribution and habitat ==
The firewood-gatherer is found in Brazil from Goiás and Minas Gerais south through Rio Grande do Sul, central and eastern Paraguay, essentially all of Uruguay, and northern Argentina from Formosa and Misiones provinces south to Río Negro Province. It inhabits a wide variety of open landscapes including seasonally wet and other grasslands, pastures and agricultural fields, savanna, scrublands, the edges of open woodlands, and stands of trees near farmhouses. In elevation it ranges from near sea level to 1,000 m (3,300 ft).

== Behavior ==
=== Movement ===
The firewood-gatherer is a year-round resident throughout its range.

=== Feeding ===
The firewood-gatherer feeds on adult and larval arthropods and seeds. It usually forages in pairs and sometimes in ll groups that may include nest helpers. It gleans on the ground and in low vegetation.

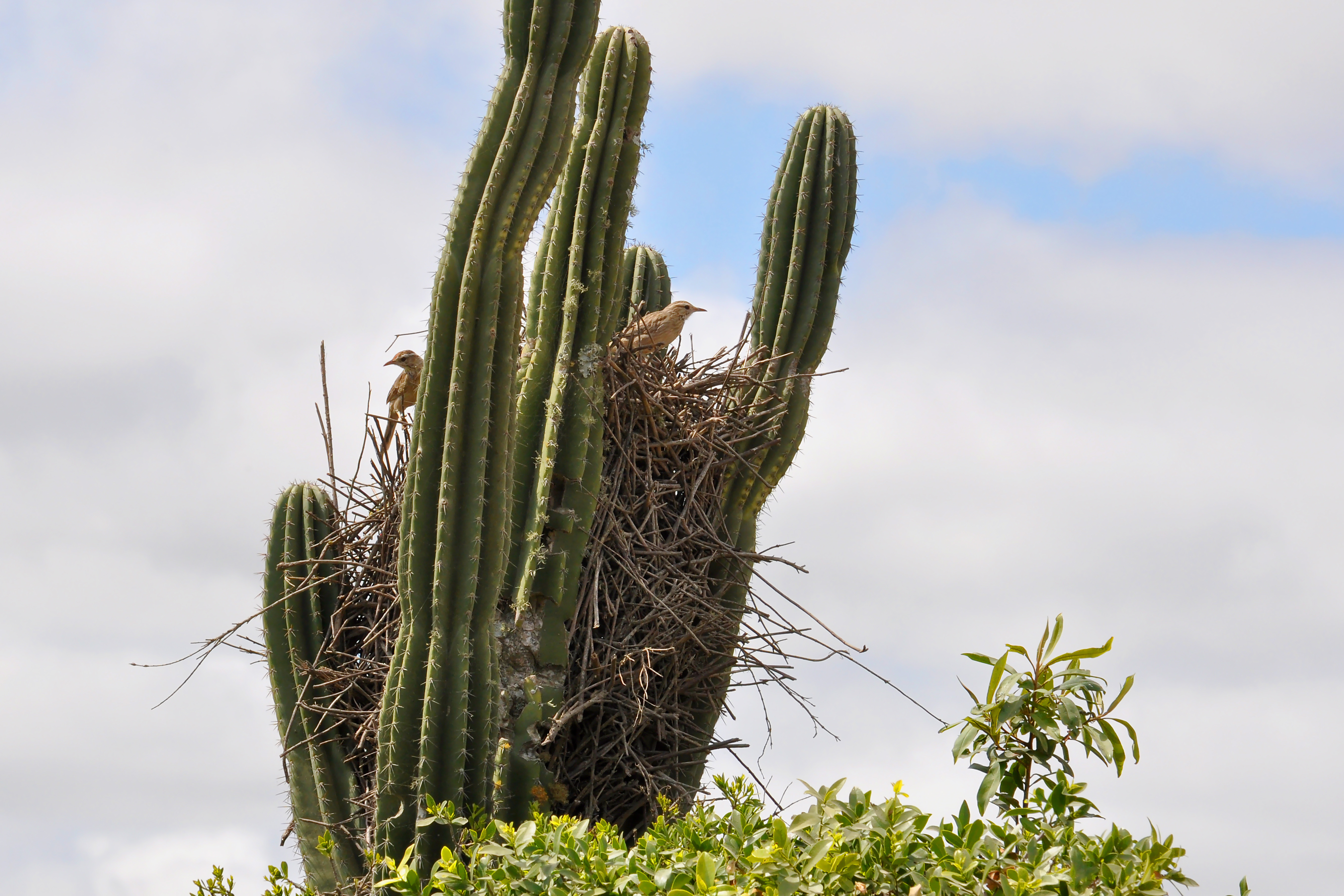
The nest of the firewood-gatherer

=== Breeding ===
The firewood-gatherer breeds in the austral spring and summer, roughly September to February. It often has two broods in a season, and the young of the first often help with nest-building for the second. It is thought to be monogamous. It builds a very large nest for a smallish bird, weaving thorny twigs into a cylinder that is usually up to 110 cm (43 in) high and 40 cm (16 in) wide, though nests double this size are known. It has an entrance hole near the top leading through a winding tunnel to the nest chamber; the chamber is lined with plant fibers, feathers, and other soft material. The nest is often placed conspicuously in an isolated tree, on the crossbar of a utility pole, or on another exposed substrate. It is usually within 4 m (13 ft) of the ground but can be up as high as 24 m (79 ft). Nests are sometimes reused. The clutch size is usually three to five eggs. The incubation period is about 16 days and fledging occurs about 17 or 18 days after hatch.

=== Vocalization ===
One description of the firewood-gatherer's song is a "strong, very high series of 2-3 hurried, staccato notes, followed by [a] short, slightly descending rattle, like 'djip-djip-drrrr' ". Another is "a fast, rough, bubbly, accelerating, descending series of trilled notes ending with lower-pitched rattle, 'chit, chit, chit, che-che-che-che-ee-ee-ee-ee-eu' ". Both members of a pair often sing in duet. The species' call is "a sharp 'stchick' ".

== Status ==
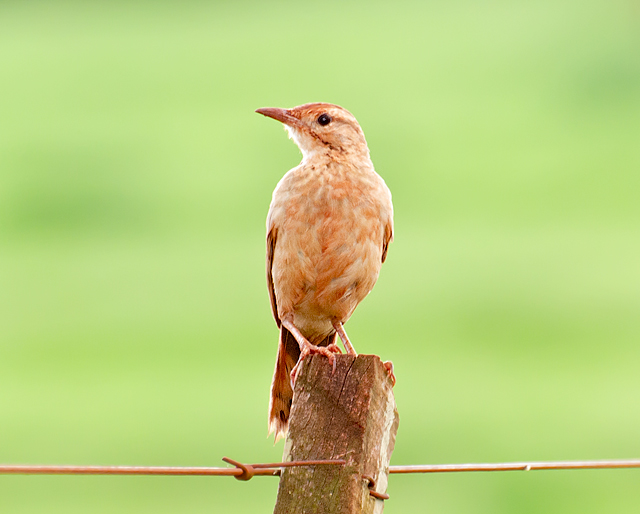

The IUCN has assessed the firewood-gatherer as being of Least Concern. It has a very large range and an unknown population size that is believed to be increasing. No immediate threats have been identified. It is considered uncommon to locally common and occurs in several protected areas. It "[t]olerates at least moderate grazing and other anthropogenic disturbance [and] presumably benefits to a degree from deforestation".
