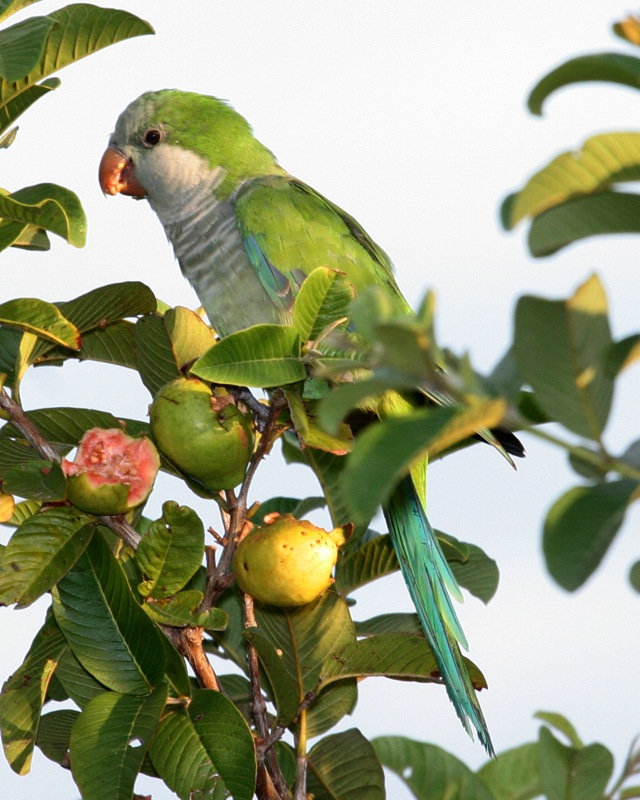

Scientific classification
- Kingdom: Animalia
- Phylum: Chordata
- Class: Aves
- Order: Psittaciformes
- Family: Psittacidae
- Subfamily: Arinae
- Genus: Myiopsitta; Bonaparte, 1854

Type species
- Psittacus murinus Gmelin, 1788

Species
- See text.

= Myiopsitta =

Genus of birds

Myiopsitta is a genus of parrots in the family Psittacidae. They are native to southeastern South America, from Bolivia and southern Brazil, south to central Argentina. They have also become invasive species where introduced elsewhere, due to the damage to crops and electrical infrastructure they cause, in parts of Europe.

The genus was introduced by French naturalist Charles Lucien Bonaparte in 1854. The type species was subsequent designated as the monk parakeet (Myiopsitta monachus) by English zoologist George Robert Gray in 1855. The genus name combines the Ancient Greek mus, muos meaning "mouse" and the Neo-Latin psitta meaning "parrot". The name alludes to the mouse-grey face and underparts of the monk parakeet.

== Species ==
Two species are currently accepted; in the past, many authors merged them as just one species within the genus:

Genus Myiopsitta – Bonaparte, 1854 – two species
Common name	Scientific name and subspecies	Range	Size and ecology	IUCN status and estimated population
Monk parakeet	Myiopsitta monachus (Boddaert, 1783) Three subspecies: M. m. monachus (Boddaert, 1783); M. m. calita (Boddaert, 1783); M. m. cotorra(Finsch, 1868)	Argentina, Brazil, and Uruguay	Size: Habitat: Diet:	LC
Cliff parakeet	Myiopsitta luchsi (Finsch, 1868)	southeastern La Paz to the northern Chuquisaca department, Bolivia	Size: Habitat: Diet:	NT
