= Ernst Luchs =

Karl Johann Nepomuk Ernst Luchs (3 September 1811 – 3 January 1886) was a German physician in the Silesian spa town of Bad Warmbrunn. He was also a naturalist, aviculturist, and collector of natural history specimens. Two species of birds were named in his honour.

Luchs was born in Warmbrunn, now Cieplice Śląskie-Zdrój. He studied medicine at the University of Breslau with a dissertation De sphygmologia (1836) and worked as a spa doctor at Warmbrunn throughout the rest of his life. He was a keen aviculturist and also made a collection of bird skins which he sold in 1878 to Ludwig Graf von Schaffgotsch (1842–1891). The ornithologist Otto Finsch named Myiopsitta luchsi (now usually treated as a subspecies of the monk parakeet Myiopsitta monachus luchsi) after him. Karl Russ named a finch species as Aegintha luchsi in 1882 which is now thought to be a hybrid of two estrildid species. Luchs was elected member of the Leopoldina academy in 1848 and was a member of the German ornithological society from 1870.
