= Luch, Zianchurinsky District, Republic of Bashkortostan =

Luch Луч
- Village
- Location within Bashkortostan Location within Russia
- Coordinates: 52°07′N 56°39′E
- Country: Russia
- Region: Bashkortostan
- District: Zianchurinsky District
- Time zone: UTC+5:00

Luch (Russian: Луч) is a rural locality (a village) in Tazlarovsky Selsoviet, Zianchurinsky District, Bashkortostan, Russia. The population was 64 as of 2010. There is 1 street.

== Geography ==
Luch is located 12 km southeast of Isyangulovo (the district's administrative centre) by road. Ivanovka is the nearest rural locality.
