= Luch, Vladimir Oblast =

Luch Луч
- Settlement
- Location within Vladimir Oblast Location within Russia
- Coordinates: 56°23′N 38°47′E
- Country: Russia
- Region: Vladimir Oblast
- District: Alexandrovsky District
- Time zone: UTC+3:00

Luch (Russian: Луч) is a rural locality (a settlement) in Andreyevskoye Rural Settlement, Alexandrovsky District, Vladimir Oblast, Russia. The population was 61 as of 2010.

== Geography ==
The village is located 14 km west from Andreyevskoye and 3 km east from Alexandrov.
