= Luch, Birsky District, Republic of Bashkortostan =

Luch Луч
- Khutor
- Location within Bashkortostan Location within Russia
- Coordinates: 55°12′N 55°27′E
- Country: Russia
- Region: Bashkortostan
- District: Birsky District
- Time zone: UTC+5:00

Luch (Russian: Луч) is a rural locality (a khutor) in Staropetrovsky Selsoviet, Birsky District, Bashkortostan, Russia. The population was 6 as of 2010. There are 2 streets.

== Geography ==
Luch is located 29 km south of Birsk (the district's administrative centre) by road. Starobiktimirovo is the nearest rural locality.
