= Luch, Sumy Oblast =

Village in Sumy Oblast, Ukraine

Luch Луч
- Rural settlement
- Location of Luch Luch (Ukraine)
- Coordinates: 51°38′29″N 33°26′03″E
- Country: Ukraine
- Oblast: Sumy Oblast
- Raion: Konotop Raion
- Hromada: Krolevets urban hromada

Population (2001)
  - Total: 48
- Postal code: 41323
- Area code: +380 5543
- Climate: Cfa

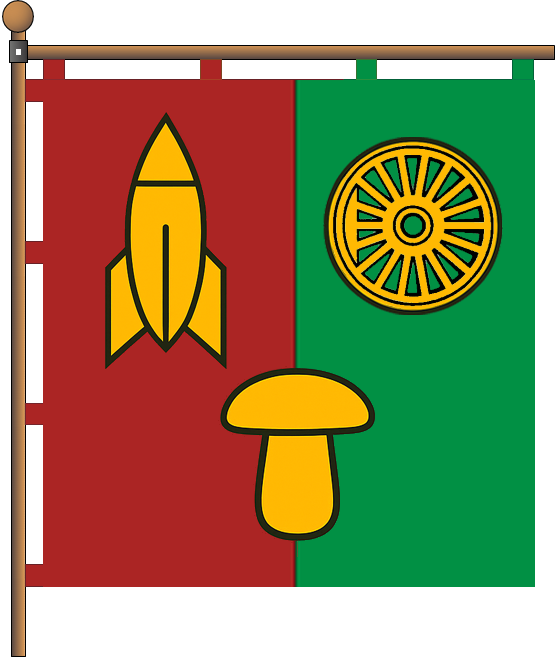
Flag of Luch

Luch (Ukrainian: Луч) is a rural settlement in Konotop Raion, Sumy Oblast (province) of Ukraine.

Until 18 July 2020, Luch was part of Krolevets Raion. In July 2020, as part of Ukraine's administrative reform, the number of raions in Sumy Oblast was reduced to five, and the territory of Krolevets Raion was merged into Konotop Raion.
