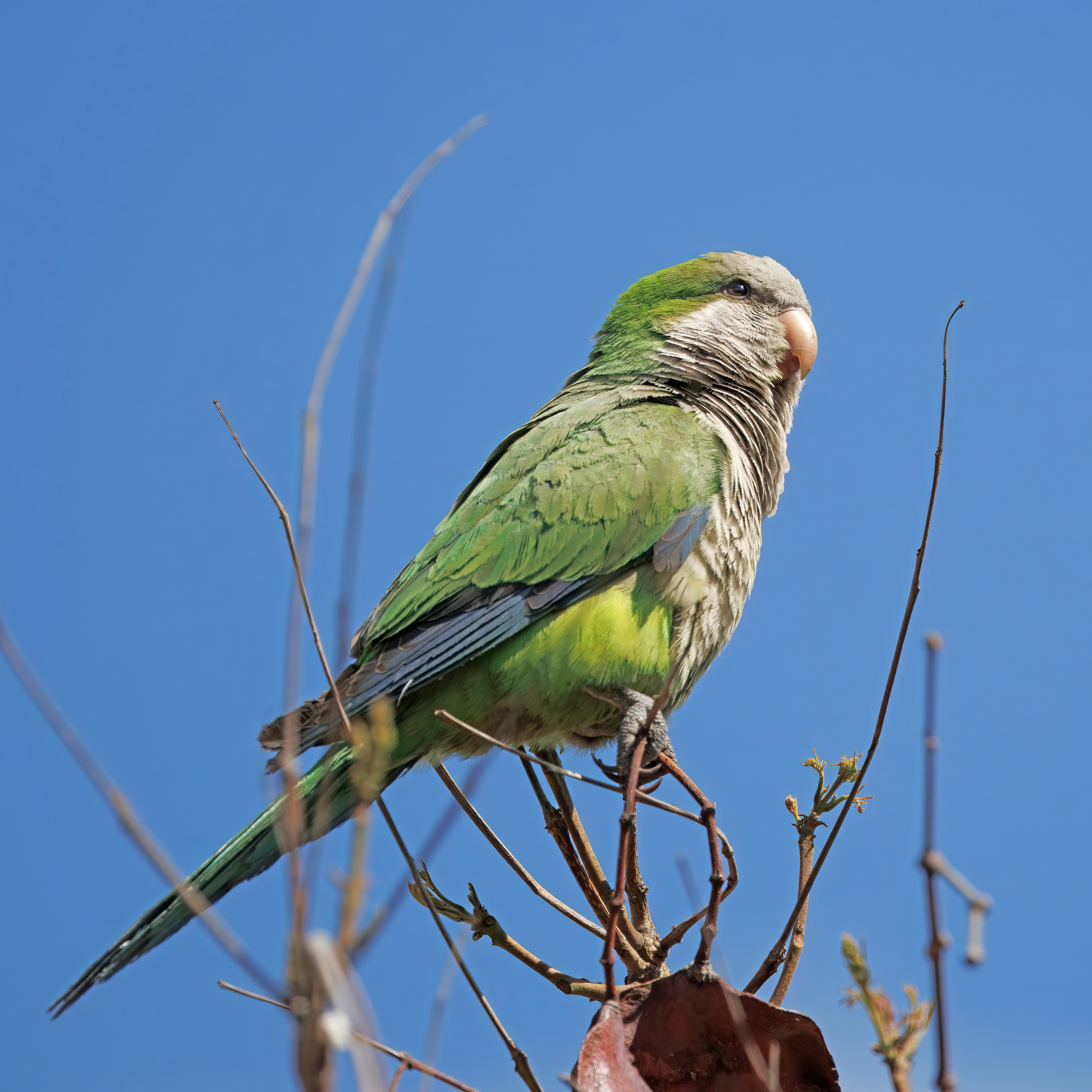
- in Chile

Conservation status
- Least Concern (IUCN 3.1)

Scientific classification
- Kingdom: Animalia
- Phylum: Chordata
- Class: Aves
- Order: Psittaciformes
- Family: Psittacidae
- Genus: Myiopsitta
- Species: M. monachus

Binomial name
- Myiopsitta monachus (Boddaert, 1783)

Subspecies
- 2–4, see text

Synonyms
- Psittacus monachus (Boddaert, 1783)

= Monk parakeet =

South American true parrot

The monk parakeet (Myiopsitta monachus), also known as the monk parrot or Quaker parrot, is a species of true parrot in the family Psittacidae. It is a small to medium bright-green parrot with a greyish breast and greenish-yellow abdomen. It originates in the temperate to subtropical areas of South America. Self-sustaining feral populations occur in many places, mainly in areas of similar climate in North America and Europe.

== Taxonomy ==
The monk parakeet was described by French polymath Georges-Louis Leclerc, Comte de Buffon, in 1780 in his Histoire Naturelle des Oiseaux. The bird was also illustrated in a hand-coloured plate engraved by François-Nicolas Martinet in the Planches Enluminées D'Histoire Naturelle, which was produced under the supervision of Edme-Louis Daubenton to accompany Buffon's text. Neither the plate caption nor Buffon's description included a scientific name, but in 1783, Dutch naturalist Pieter Boddaert coined the binomial name Psittacus monachus in his catalogue of the Planches Enluminées. As Buffon did not specify the origin of his specimen, in 1937 the American ornithologist James Peters assigned the type location as Montevideo, Uruguay. The monk parakeet is now placed in the genus Myiopsitta that was introduced by French naturalist Charles Lucien Bonaparte in 1854. The genus name combines the Ancient Greek mus, muos meaning "mouse" and the Neo-Latin psitta meaning "parrot", alluding to the mouse-grey face and underparts. The specific epithet monachus is Late Latin for "monk".

The monk parakeet is one of two species in the genus Myiopsitta, the other being the cliff parakeet (Myiopsitta luchsi). The latter was previously treated as a subspecies of the Monk Parakeet. Due to morphological and behavioural differences, and geographical dissimilarities, the International Ornithological Committee elevated the cliff parakeet to species status in 2015. BirdLife International's Handbook of the Birds of the World followed suit in 2020 and the South American Classification Committee of the American Ornithological Society in late 2024. As of late 2024 the Clements taxonomy retains the cliff parakeet as a subspecies of the monk parakeet. The monk and cliff parakeets' elevational ranges apparently do not overlap, so they are thus entirely, but just barely, allopatric.

Three subspecies are recognized:

- M. m. monachus (Boddaert, 1783) is found in Argentina from southeastern Santiago del Estero Province throughout the Río Salado and lower Paraná basins to Buenos Aires Province and Uruguay; it is the largest subspecies.
- M. m. calita (Boddaert, 1783) is found in the Andean foothills up to 1,000 m above mean sea level, from southeastern Bolivia (Santa Cruz and Tarija departments) to Paraguay and northwestern Argentina, then west of the range of monachus, extending into the lowlands again in Río Negro and possibly Chubut provinces. Smaller than monachus, wings more prominently blue, grey of head darker.
- M. m. cotorra (Finsch, 1868) is found in southwestern Brazil (Mato Grosso, Mato Grosso do Sul, possibly Rio Grande do Sul) throughout the Río Paraguay and middle Paraná basins, as well as the Gran Chaco. It is essentially identical to M. m. calita, but reported as less yellow below and brighter overall.

The subspecies' ranges meet in the general area of Paraguay, and there they are insufficiently delimited. The distinctness and delimitation of M. m. calita and M. m. cotorra especially require further study.

== Description ==
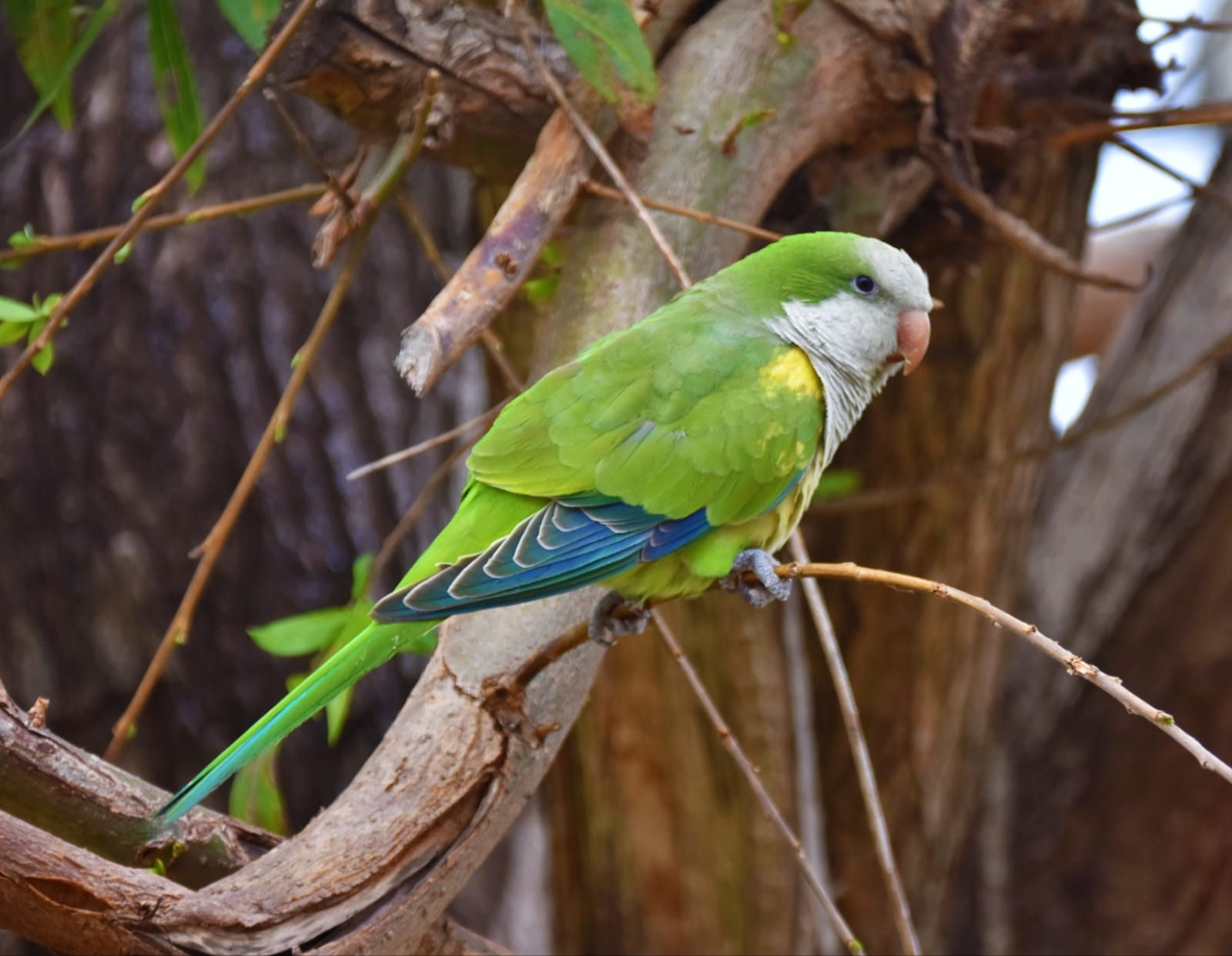
Female pet from a free flight session in Uruguay

External audio
- Monk Parakeet bird call may be heard here, from xeno-canto.org, retrieved 1.08.2018

The nominate subspecies of this parrot is 29 cm (11 in) long on average, with a 48-centimetre (19 in) wingspan, and weighs 95–120 g (3.4–4.2 oz). Females tend to be 5–10% smaller, but can only be reliably sexed by DNA or feather testing. Monk parakeets display very subtle sexual dimorphism in the colouration of their crown and wing coverts, but this is not noticeable to the human eye. It has bright-green upperparts. The forehead and breast are pale grey with darker scalloping and the rest of the underparts are very light-green to yellow. The remiges are dark blue, and the tail is long and tapering. The bill is orange. The call is a loud and throaty chape(-yee) or quak quaki quak-wi quarr, and screeches skveet.

Domestic breeds in colours other than the natural plumage have been produced. These include birds with white, blue, and yellow in place of green. As such colouration provides less camouflage, feral birds are usually of wild-type green colouration, but other colours have been documented in the wild.

== Behaviour and ecology ==
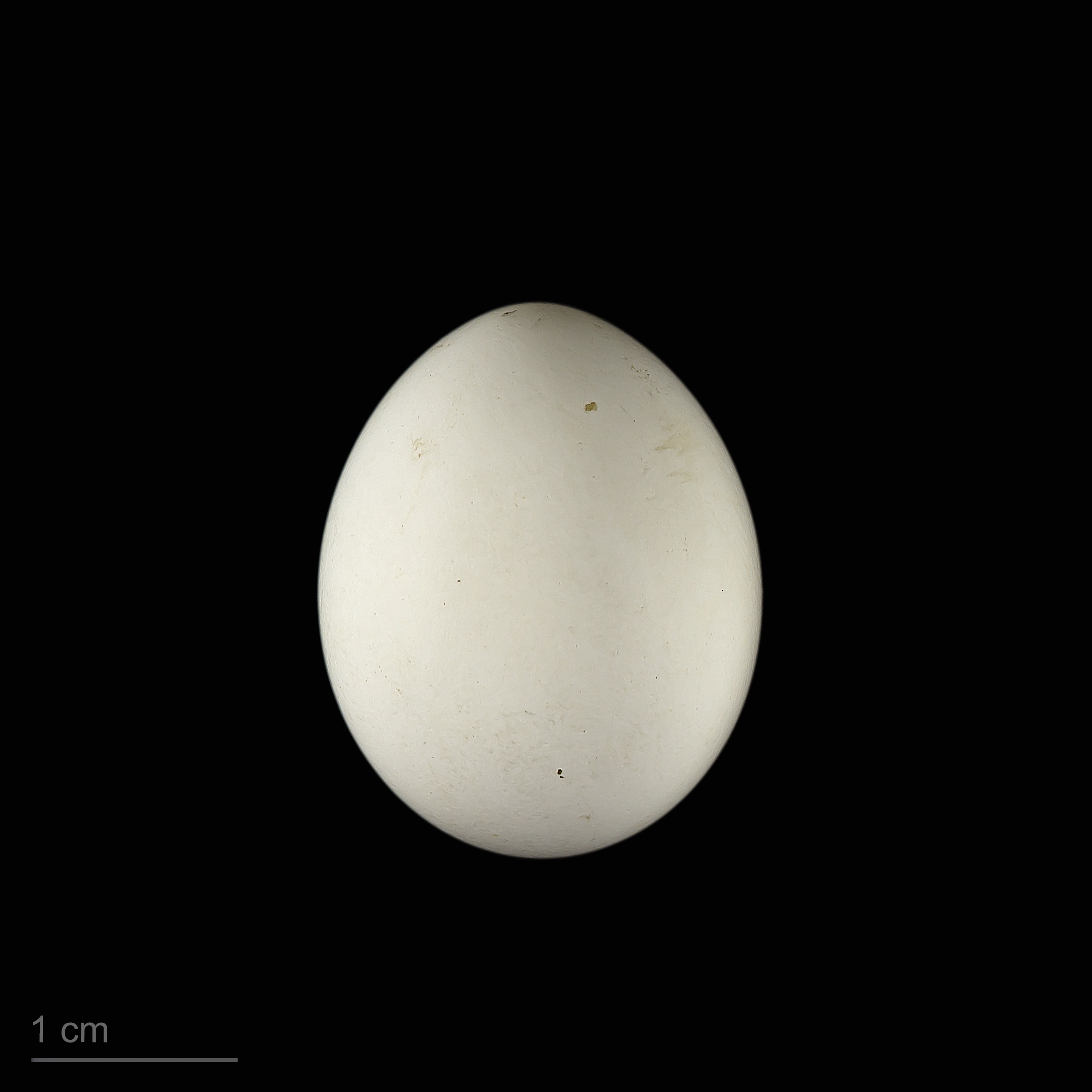
An egg of monk parakeet.

The monk parakeet and the cliff parakeet are the only two parrot species outside some members of the African lovebirds (Agapornis sp.) that build nests. Monk and cliff parakeets are unique among even nesting parrots for their construction of large, external nests in trees or manmade structures instead of using tree cavities.

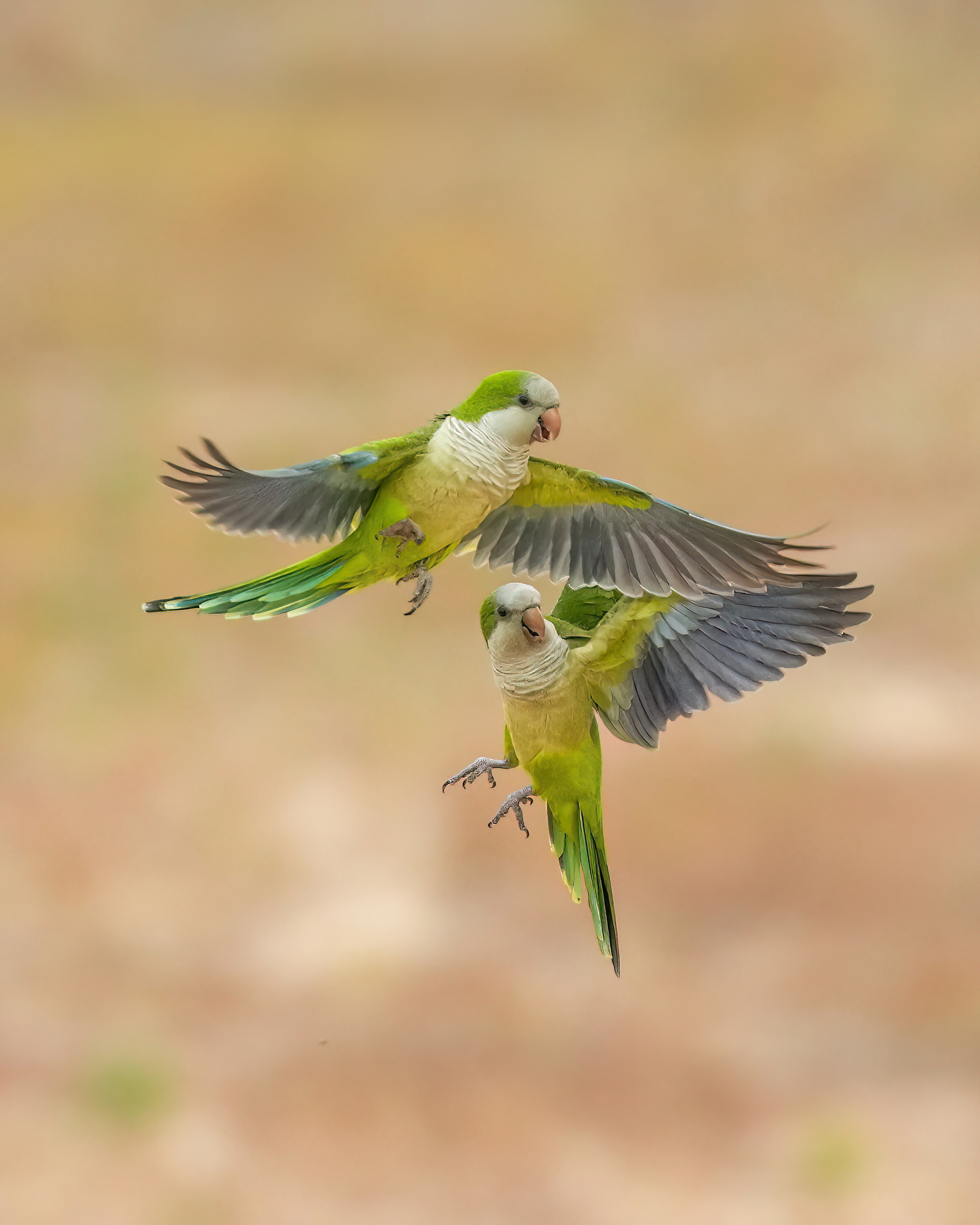
Couple in flight in Mato Grosso, Brazil

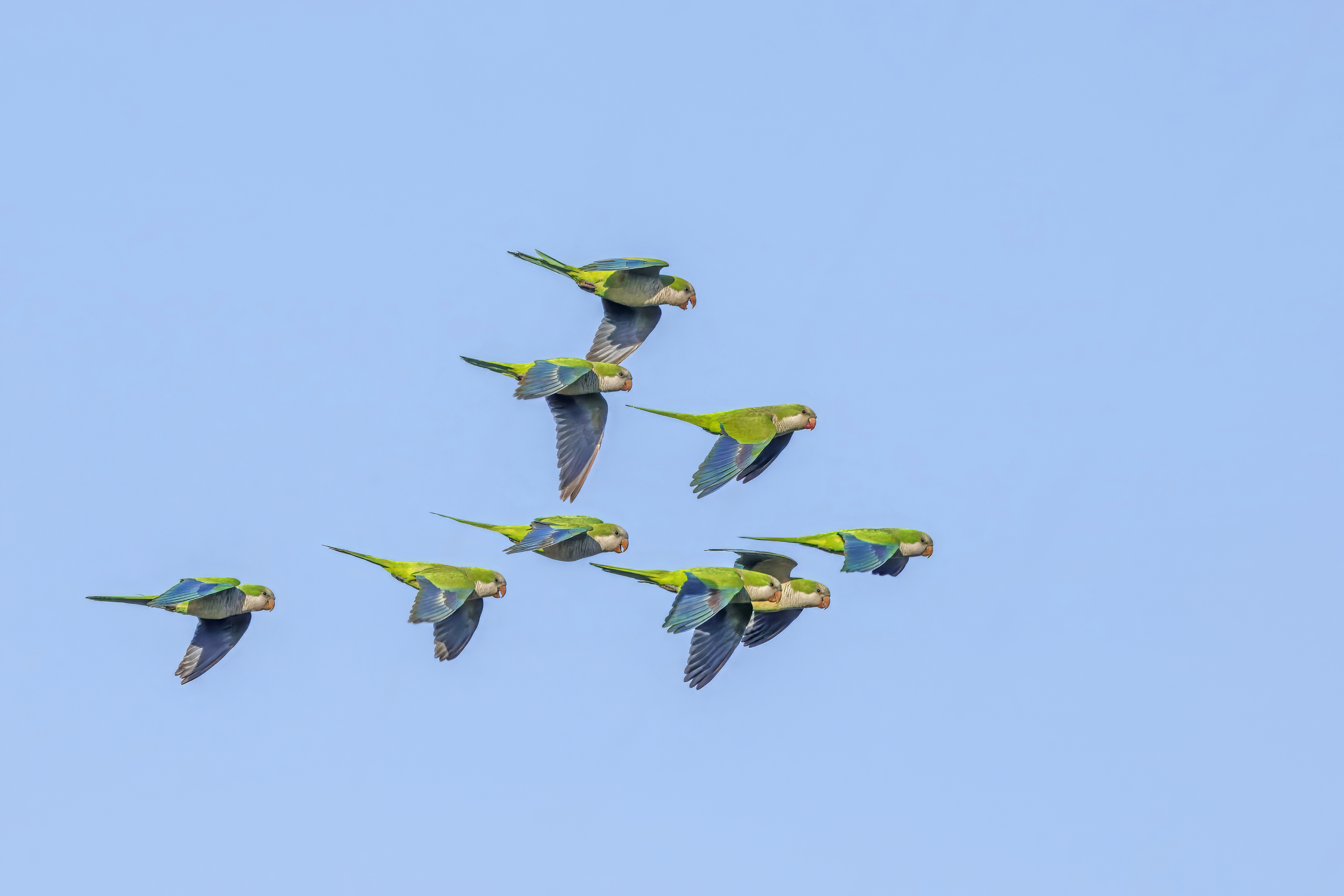
flock in Uruguay

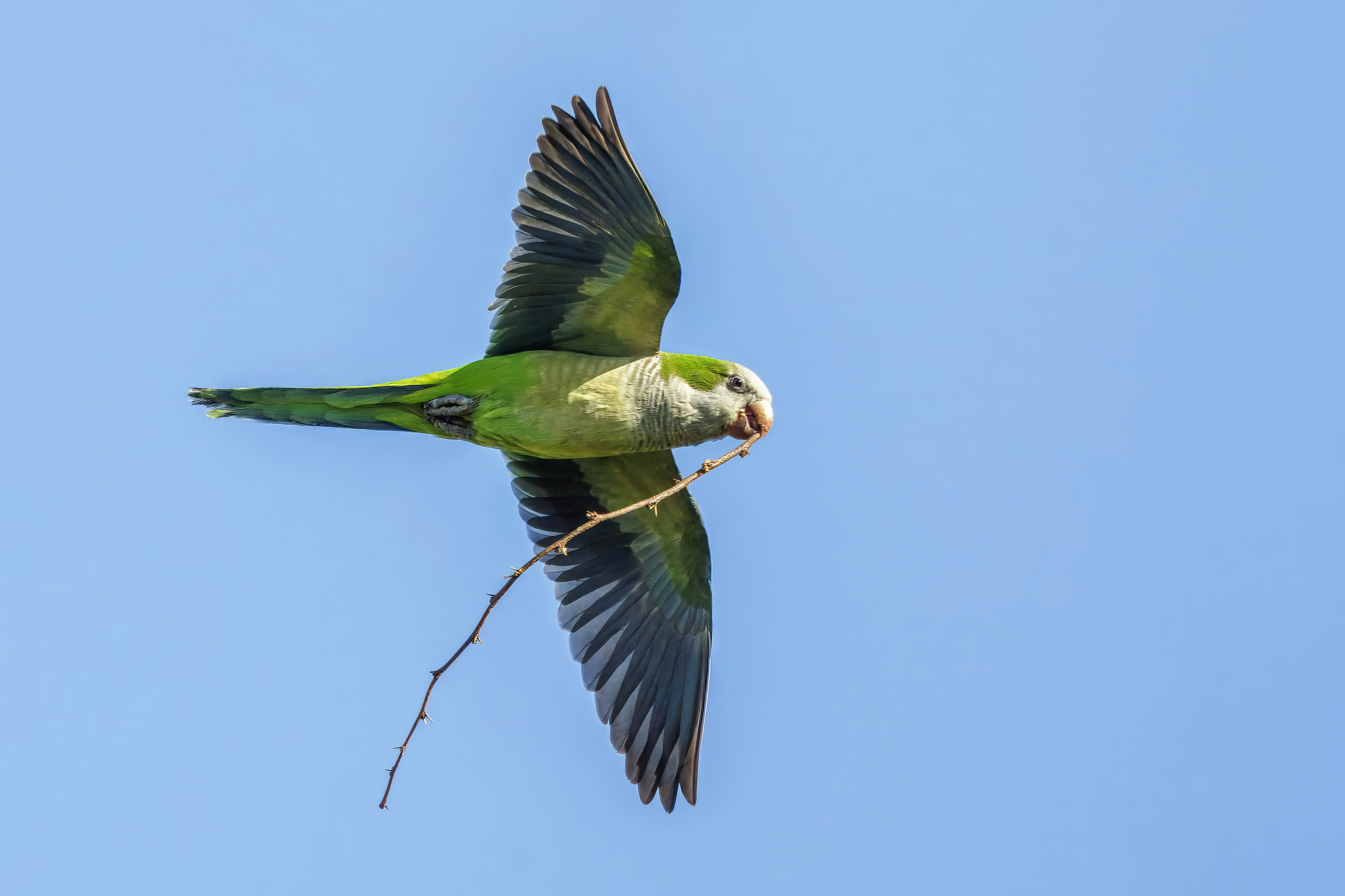
with nesting material, Uruguay

building nest in Brazil

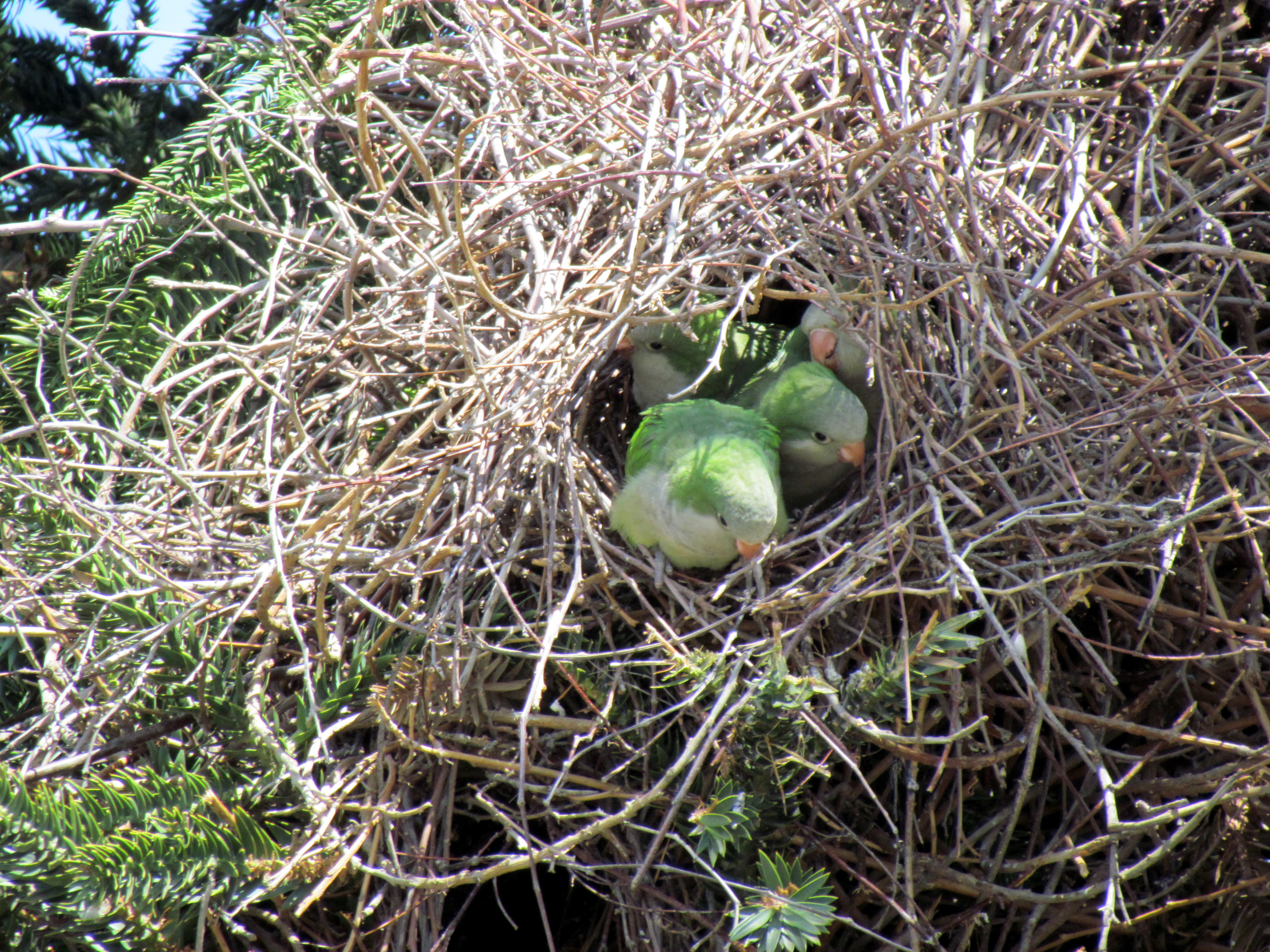
nest in Santiago

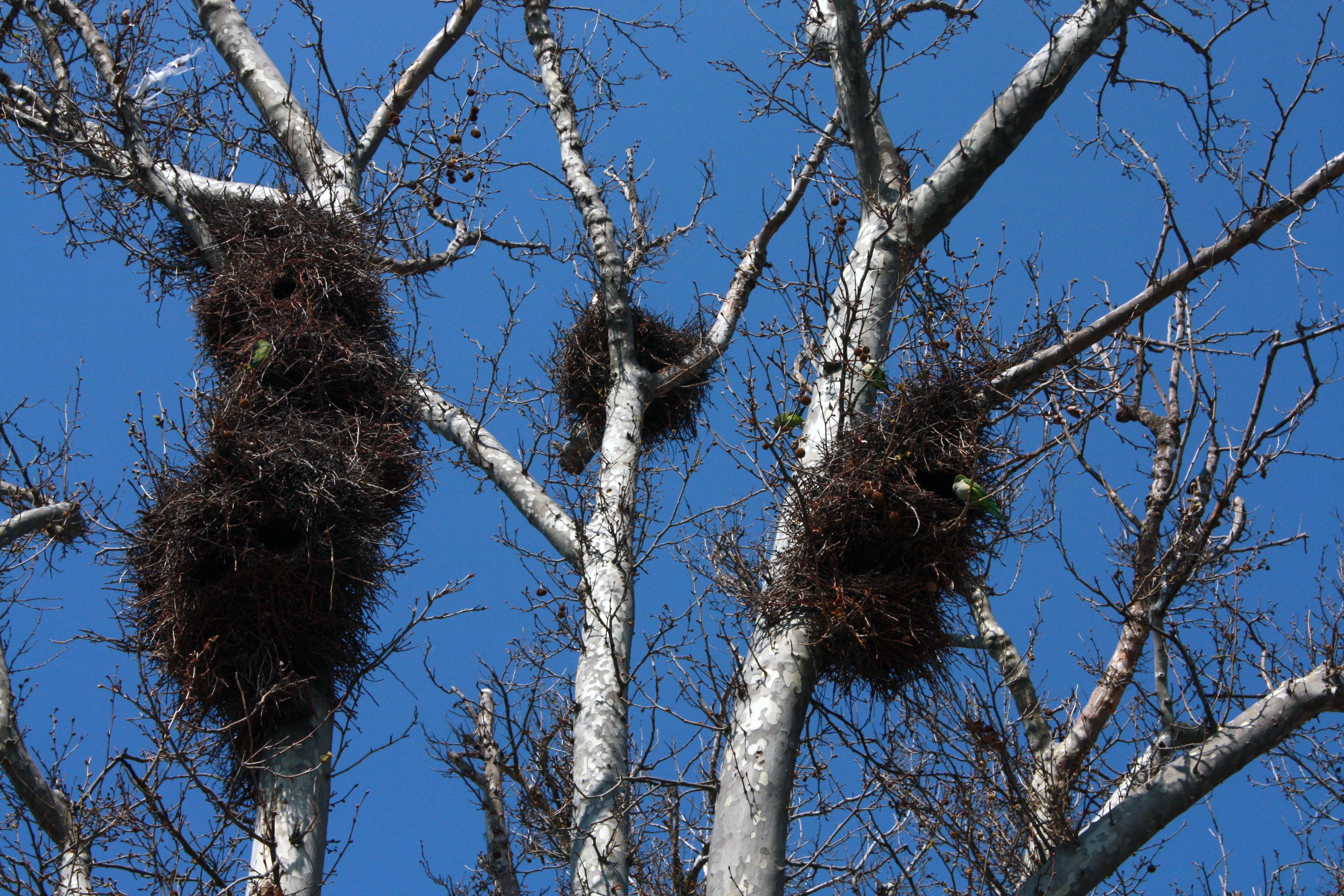
Nests in Zaragoza

The monk parakeet is a gregarious species which often breeds colonially, building a single large nest with separate entrances for each pair. It is not uncommon, however, for pairs or individuals to nest outside of colonies, especially during the breeding season. In the wild, the colonies can become quite large, with pairs occupying separate "apartments" in composite nests that can reach the size of a small automobile. These nests can attract many other tenants, including some which cohabit with the monk parakeets. These tenants include many other birds, such as pigeons, sparrows, American kestrels, and yellow-billed teal, but mammals like red squirrels may also occupy a nest. Monk parakeets also sometimes breed in groups, with a Barcelona-based study finding that about 20% of monk parakeet breeding units are composed of three to five birds. These breeding groups can be made of both related and unrelated birds, and sometimes involve multiple females laying their eggs in one nest.

Their 1–11 white eggs are incubated continuously by the female, during which time the male will provide her with food. Unusually for a parrot, monk parakeet pairs occasionally have helper individuals, often grown offspring, which assist with feeding the young (see kin selection).

Monk parakeets have an average lifespan in their natural environment of 6 years. However, monk parakeets in captivity can reach 25 – 30 years.

Monk parakeets are thought to have individual voice prints that allow them to recognize each other, independently from the used call type.

In both their native South America, as well as areas where they have been introduced, monk parakeets are among the most destructive birds for crops. Several countries have implemented measures to control the spread of feral populations; nest removal is a common practice in the United States, and the United Kingdom's Department for the Environment, Food and Rural Affairs is planning to remove monk parakeet colonies, citing threats to infrastructure and potential crop damage.

Feral populations are often descended from very small founder populations. Being as social and intelligent as they are, monk parakeets develop some cultural traditions, namely vocal dialects that differ between groups. In populations descended from a large number of birds, a range of "dialects" exists. If the founder population is small, however, a process similar to genetic drift may occur if prominent founders vocalize in an unusual "dialect", with this particular way of vocalizing becoming established in the resulting feral colony. For example, no fewer than three different "dialects" occur among the feral monk parrots of the Milford, Connecticut, metropolitan area.

== Native distribution ==
In its native range, the monk parakeet is very common. In Argentina, Brazil, and Uruguay, monk parakeets are regarded as major agricultural pests (as noted by Charles Darwin, among others). Their population explosion in South American rural areas seems to be associated with the expansion of eucalyptus forestry for paper pulp production, which offers the bird the opportunity to build protected nests in artificial forests where ecological competition from other species is limited.

== Invasive species ==
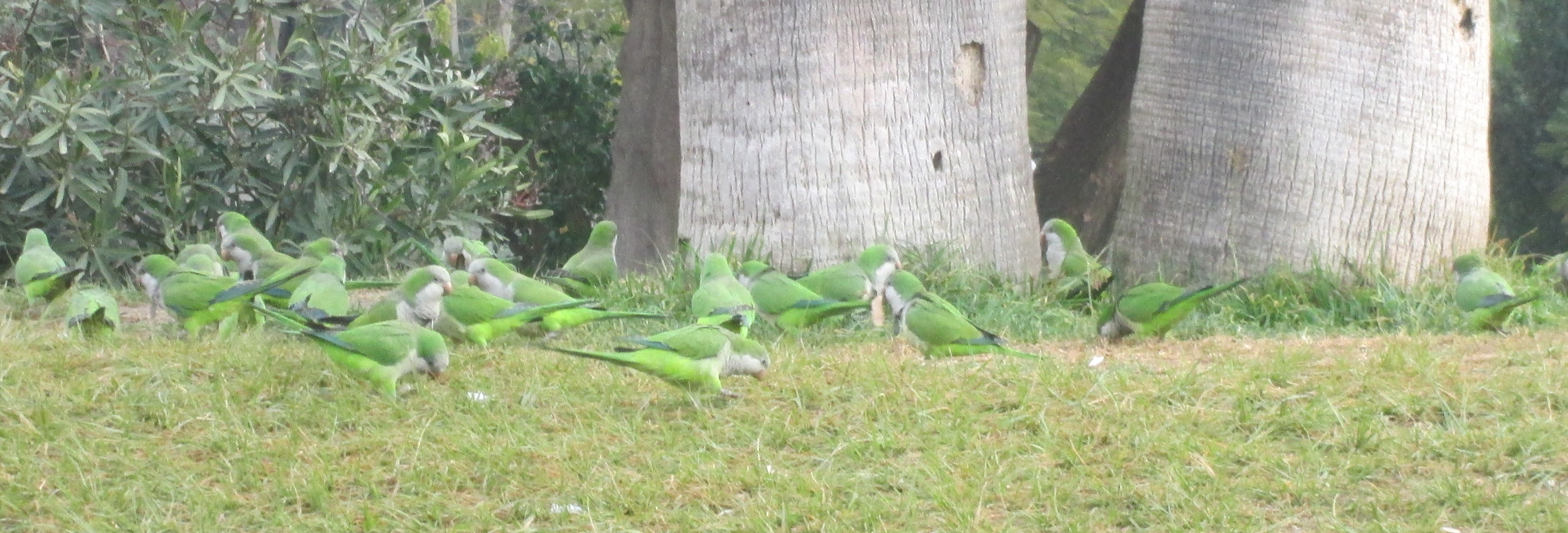
Flock in Parc de la Ciutadella

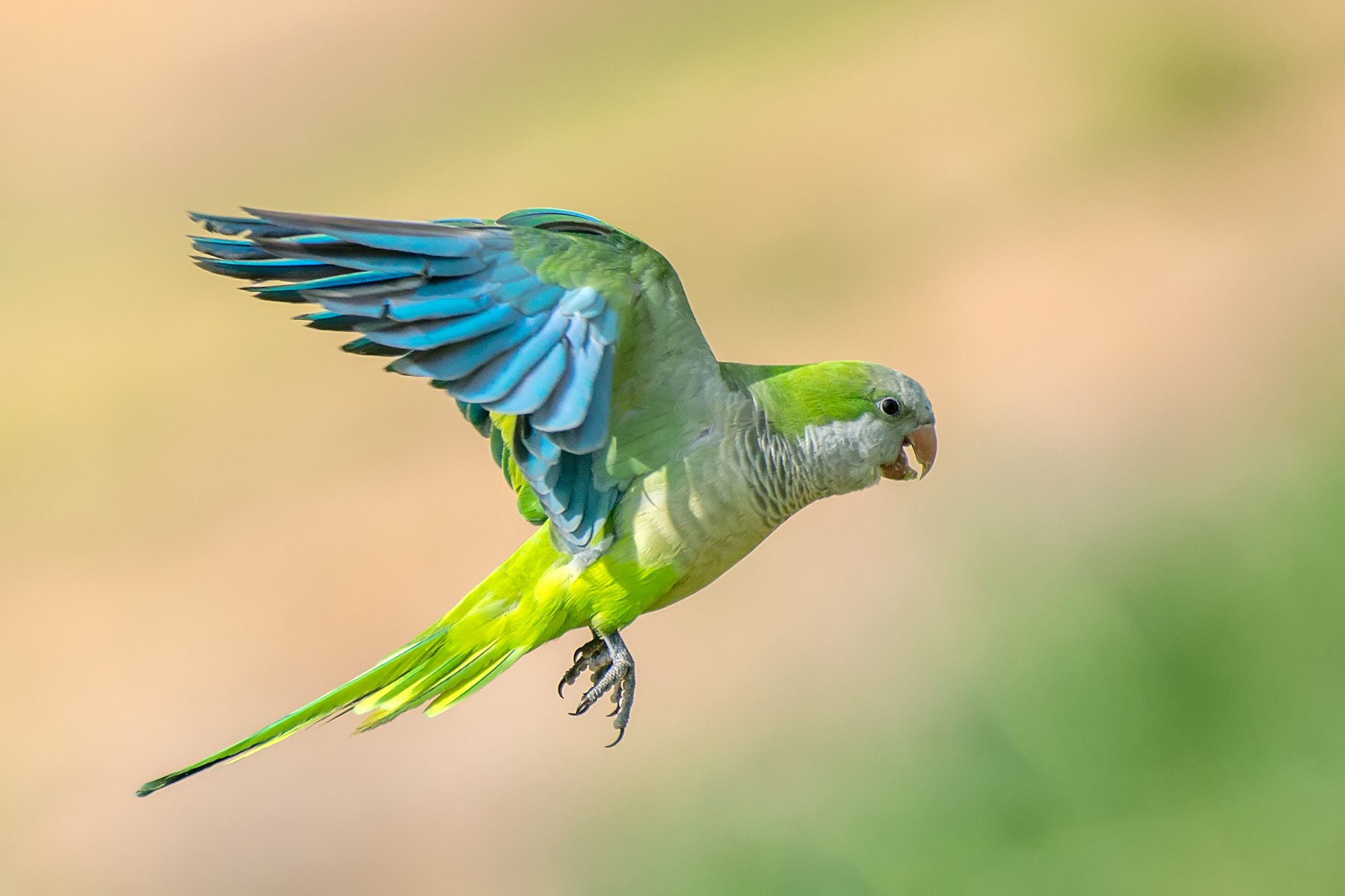
Monk parakeet in Ga'ash

Feral populations have been recorded in Europe, the Americas, North Africa, the Middle East, and East and Southeast Asia.

As one of the few temperate-zone parrots, the monk parakeet is able to survive in cold climates. This is partly attributed to their habit of building nests on warm electrical equipment, which also can create serious fire risk.

=== Europe ===
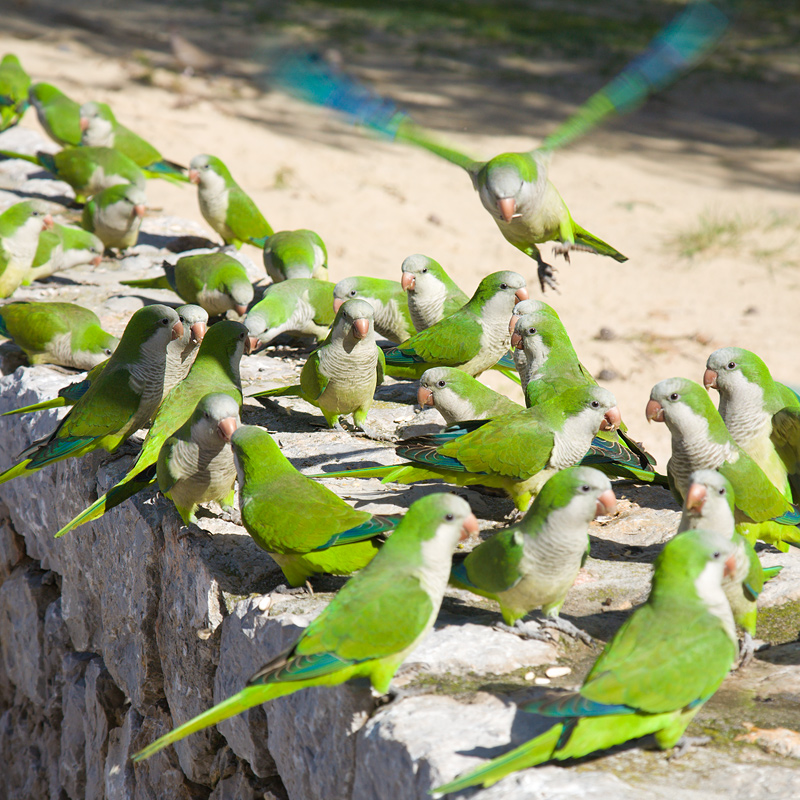
A flock in Santa Ponsa

It is estimated that monk parakeets in Spain account for more than 80% of Europe's feral population. As an invasive species, it harms local fauna such as pigeons and sparrows, as well as crops. Spain has outlawed the possession and trafficking of monk parakeets since 2013. Madrid had the greatest population of monk parakeets in Europe, with 10,800 as of June 2015, and the population in Barcelona was estimated at 5,000 in the same year. Between 2013 and 2021, the monk parakeet population in Seville increased from 1,200 to 6,300 individuals.

Other locations with documented populations include:

- Canary Islands
- Portugal
- Balearic Islands
- France
- Sardinia
- Italy
- Greece
- Great Britain
- Belgium
- Netherlands

In Greece, monk parakeets have established breeding colonies in the National Garden, Athens. In the United Kingdom, the Department for the Environment, Food and Rural Affairs announced plans in 2011 to control them, countering the threat to infrastructure, crops, and native British wildlife by trapping and rehoming, removing nests, and shooting when necessary.

Groups of monk parakeets can be found in the Belgian capital city Brussels and its surrounding areas. They have been living in the wild at least since the 1970s.

Monk parakeet populations have previously been reported in Denmark, Germany, Austria, and Czechia, but have not survived; the relatively colder weather in these countries likely contributes to these failed invasions. Other populations in the UK, France, and the Netherlands have also similarly declined into extirpation.

=== Middle East ===
Populations have been documented in:

- Israel

=== The Americas ===
Populations have been documented in:

- Canada
- Mexico
- Brazil
- Chile
- Bahamas
- United States
- Cayman Islands
- Puerto Rico

==== Brazil ====
The species has in recent years expanded its range in Brazil, where a self-sustaining population occurs in the downtown area of Rio de Janeiro. Since this population occurs far from the bird's original range in Brazil – it was only found in the far south and southwest – it is most probably a consequence of escapees from the pet trade.

==== Bahamas ====
A breeding population on the island of Eleuthera was present from 1985 to the mid 1990s, but had disappeared by 1996, possibly due to the impact of hurricanes.

==== Canada ====
In 1984, six monk parakeets were released from a pet store in Dollard-des-Ormeaux, a suburb of Montreal, Quebec. In May 1987, monk parakeets were recorded breeding in Canada for the first time in the Montreal suburb of Laval; this constitutes the northernmost continental breeding record for the species.

==== Mexico ====
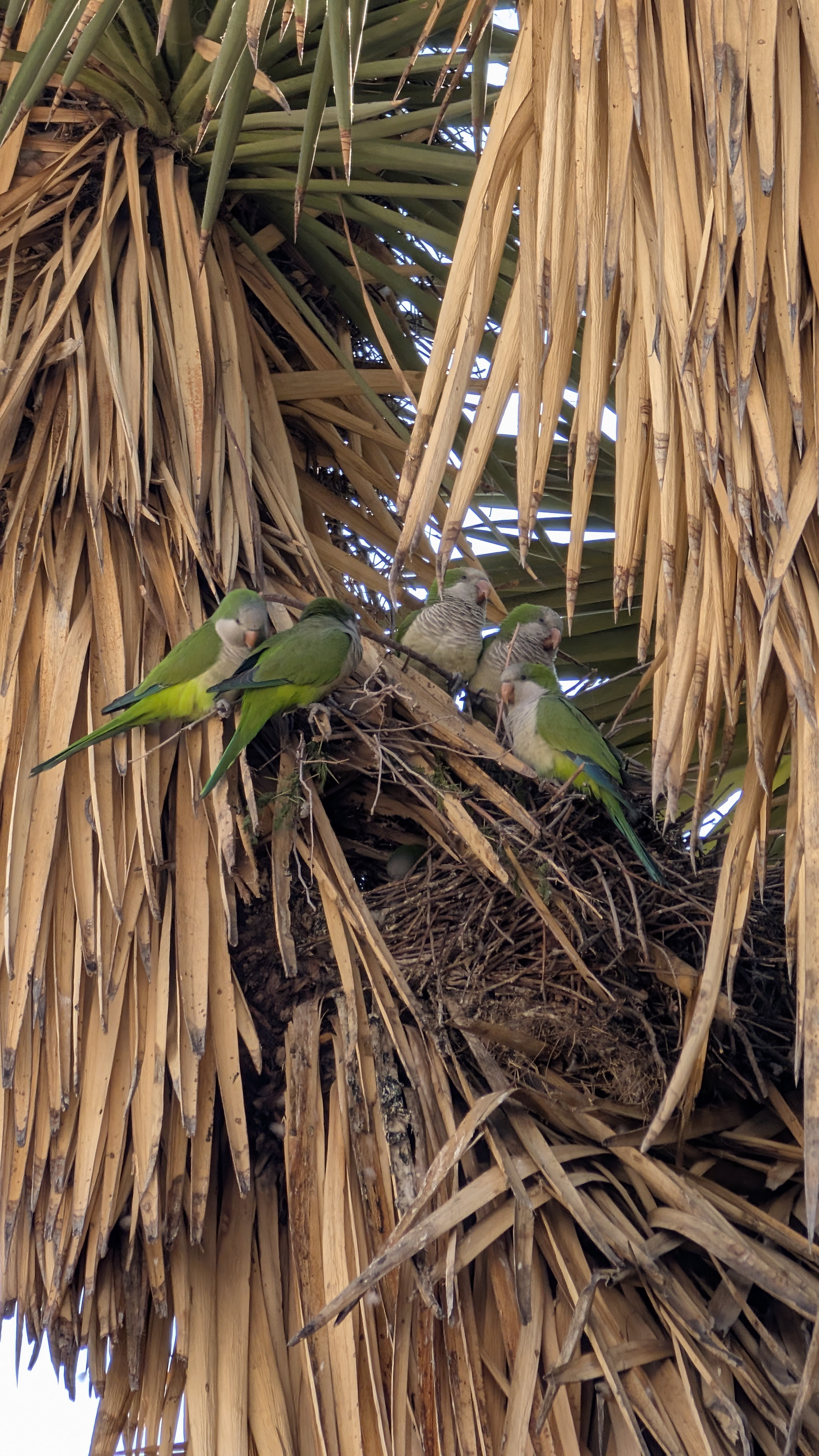
Group of five monk parakeets (Myiopsitta monachus) on their nest in Aguascalientes, Mexico

The monk parakeet was first recorded in Mexico City between 1994 and 1995. As of 2015, monk parakeets have been reported in 97 Mexican cities, and in all regions of the country.

Following a 2008 ban on the capture and sale of native parrot species, the legal pet market pivoted to the sale of monk parakeets, which likely increased the number of escapees and subsequent feral populations. Sometimes, the head and breast feathers of monk parakeets are dyed yellow to deceive uninformed buyers, mimicking the endangered yellow-headed amazon.

==== United States ====
Thousands of monk parakeets were imported to the United States between the 1960s and the 1980s as pets. Many escaped or were intentionally released, and populations were allowed to proliferate. By the early 1970s, M. monachus was established in seven states, and by 1995, it had spread to eight more. In Florida alone, estimates range from 150,000 to 500,000. Austin, Dallas, and Houston, Texas, also have thriving monk parakeet populations.

===== New York State =====
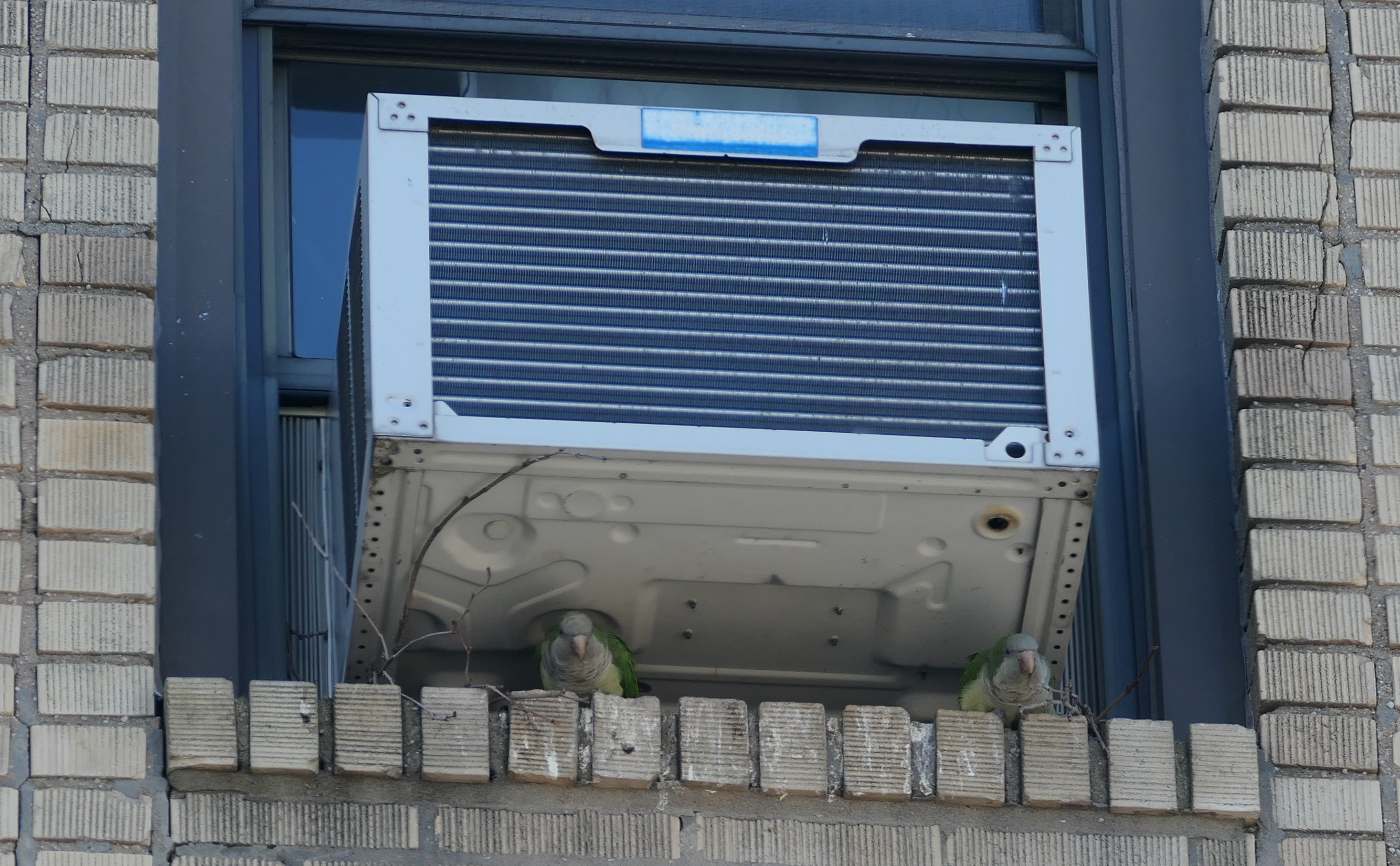
Pair of monk parakeets nesting under an air conditioner in Brooklyn, NY

In 2012, a pair of monk parakeets attempted nesting in Watervliet, New York, about 240 km (150 mi) north of New York City, near Albany, New York.

They have also found a home in Brooklyn, and Queens, New York, notably in Green-Wood Cemetery, with some speculating they were accidentally released at John F. Kennedy Airport in the 1960s. They thrive in Brooklyn, Queens, and western Long Island due to their preference for nesting in utility poles; populations have not expanded to Manhattan because of the borough's underground wiring.

==== Chicago ====
The population in Chicago is estimated to be at 1,000 birds, with healthy colonies located in several of the city's parks. According to University of Chicago ornithologist Dr. Stephen Pruett-Jones, the population originated in the pet trade. The first documented parrot nest in Chicago dates to 1973. The species thrives despite harsh winters; attempts to remove them have been resisted by Hyde Park residents, including Mayor Harold Washington. The birds are generally welcomed in the city, especially by bird watchers, and were the subject of a 2012 ornithological study.

===== Puerto Rico =====
The popularity of monk parrots in animal trade during the 1950s and 1970s made them a relatively common pet in the island and, by the 1990s, numerous escapee populations had already been recorded in San Juan, Toa Baja (particularly, Levittown), Naguabo and Guaynabo. Today they are most common in San Juan and other urban areas, and in the northern and southern coastal plains of Puerto Rico. They are most frequently found in gardens and city parks, farms and palm groves. The monk parakeet is the most widespread species of parrot in the island today.

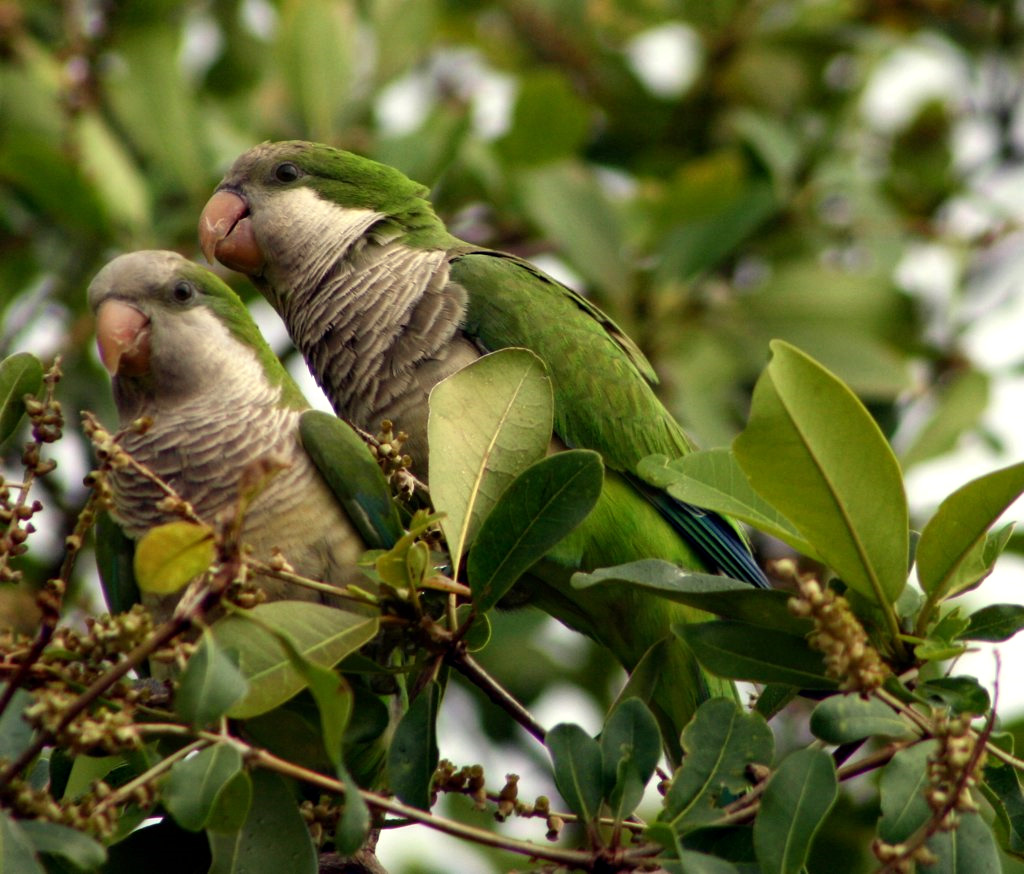
Two Monk parakeets in a tree – Florida

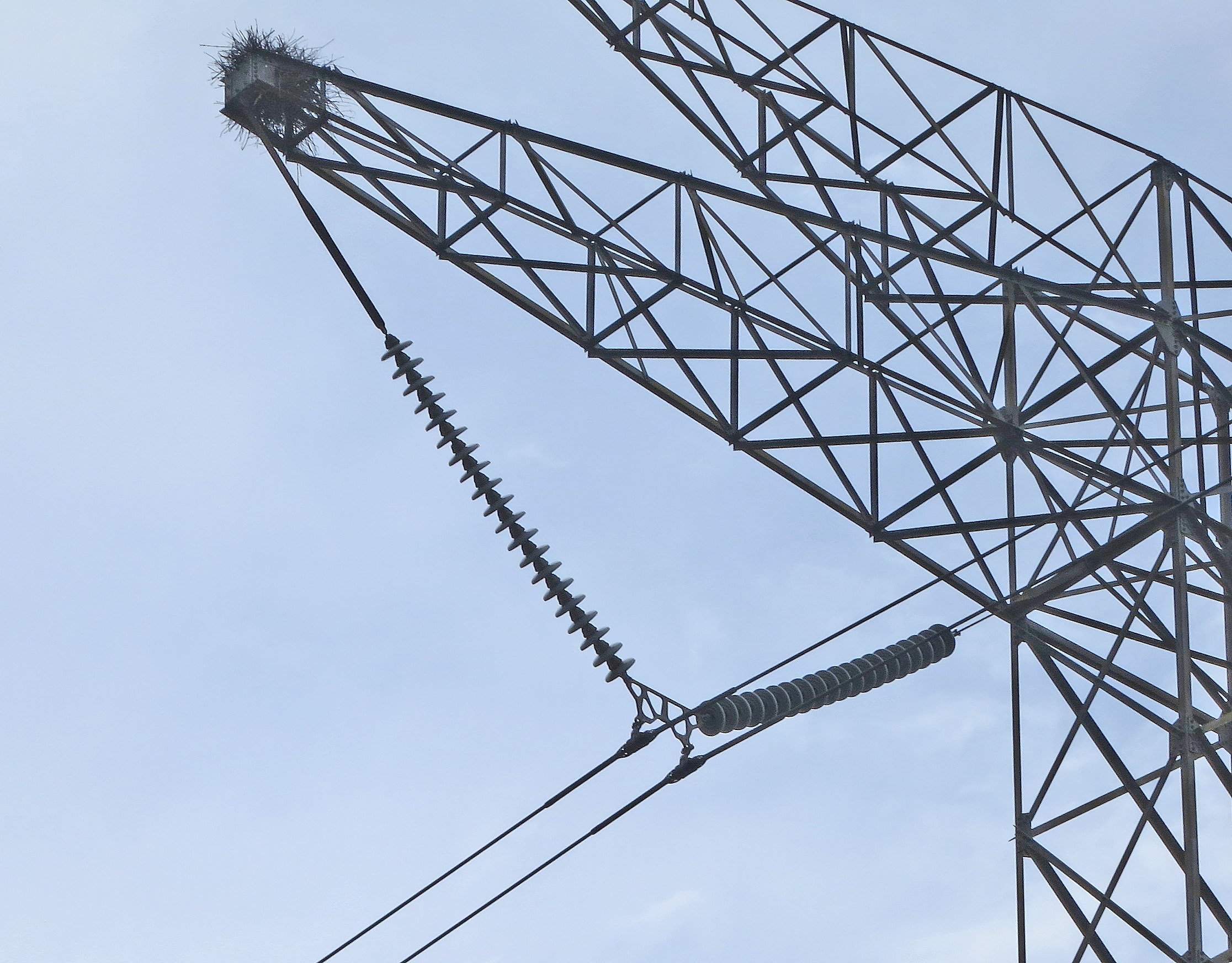
Monk parakeet nest in League City

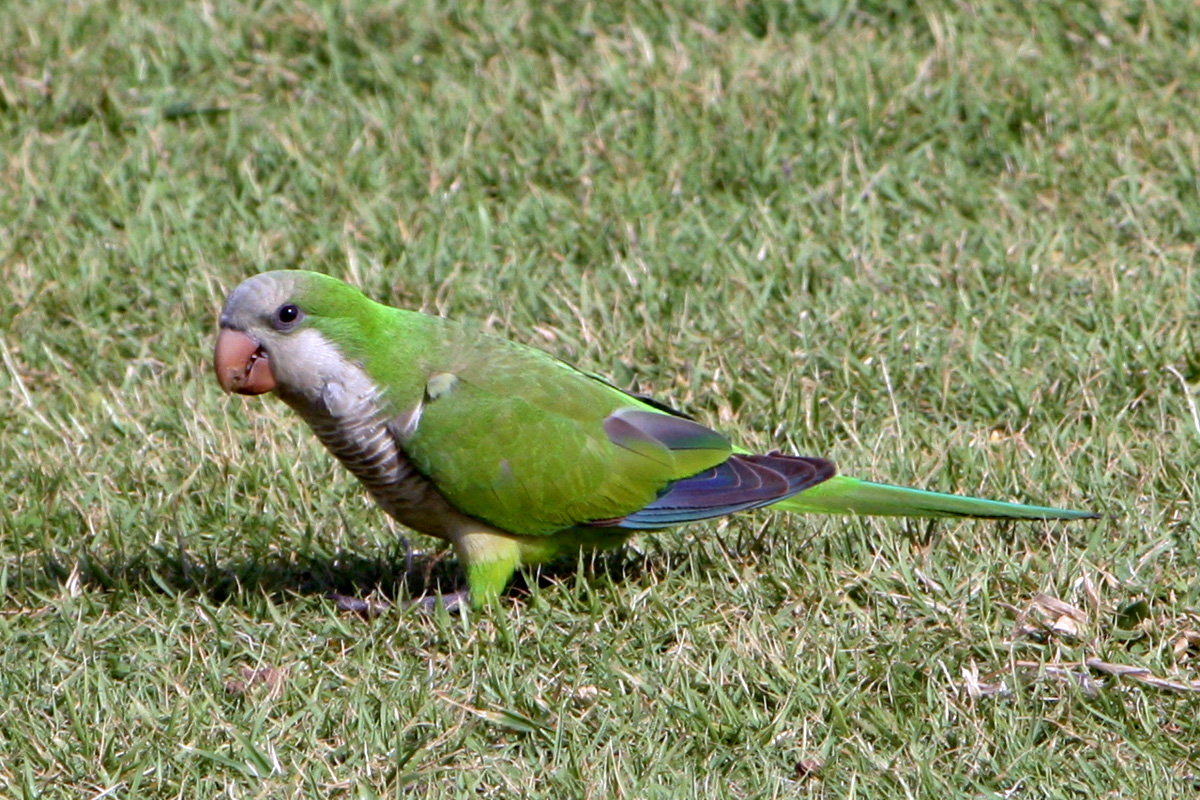
Monk parakeet in San Juan

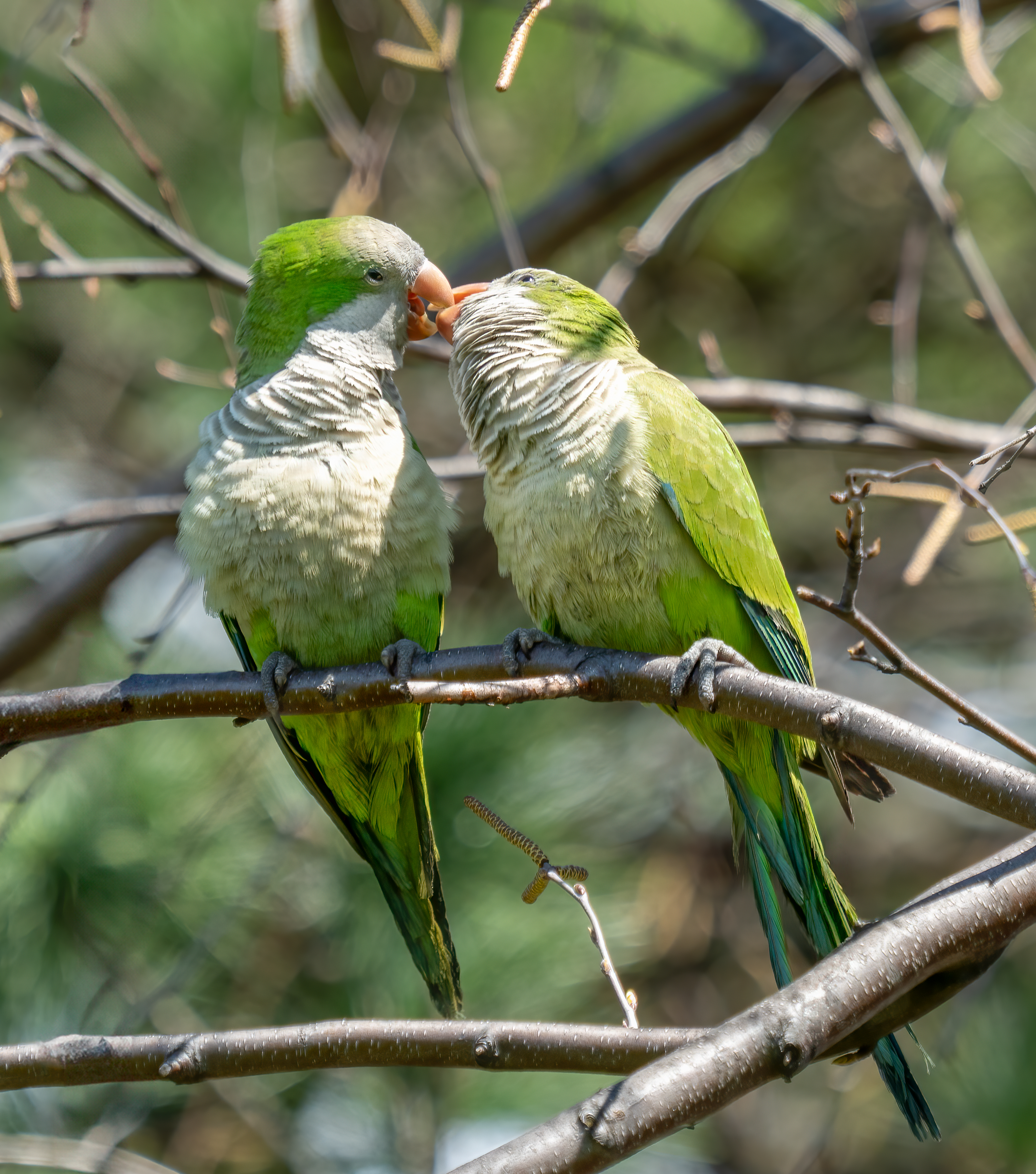
Pair of monk parakeets in Green-Wood Cemetery, Brooklyn, NY

The large nest in the Green-Wood Cemetery gate

=== New Zealand/Australia ===
New Zealand has been identified as at a high risk of invasion by the monk parakeet, given its favourable habitat and climate conditions, and its captive population on the island. Auckland has banned the sale, breeding, and distribution of monk parakeets since September 1, 2022, however, pre-existing monk parakeets can be kept. Monk parakeets, among some other parrots, have been classified as pests that compete with native birds and damage native trees.

Australia is at risk for many of the same reasons as New Zealand, and large cities have reported high frequencies of escape incidents by this species. It is one of the most common bird species reported missing on lost pet websites.

== Diet ==
Monk parakeets are primarily herbivorous, though they are technically omnivorous, eating things such as insects and worms. Their diet mostly consists of seeds, fruits and vegetables, and grains.

== As pets ==
Monk parakeets are highly intelligent, social birds. Those kept as pets routinely develop vocabularies of scores of words and phrases.

Monk parakeets often times form deep bonds with a single bird or caretaker, and these bonds usually last for life.

The monk parakeet is considered quite egocentric in its behavior, often wanting to be at the center of attention and becoming aggressive if they feel that they are unpleased with your attention.

Because of monk parakeets' listing as an agricultural pest and invasive species, the U.S. states of California, Colorado, Georgia, Hawaii, Idaho, Kansas, Kentucky, Maine, New Jersey, Pennsylvania, Tennessee, Wisconsin, and Wyoming, as well as Western Australia outlaw their sale and ownership. In Connecticut, ownership is permitted, but sale and breeding are prohibited. In New York and Virginia, one can own monk parakeets with banding and registration. In Rhode Island, an exotic animal possession permit is required for ownership. In Ohio, owning one is legal if the bird's flight feathers are clipped or it is incapable of free flight.

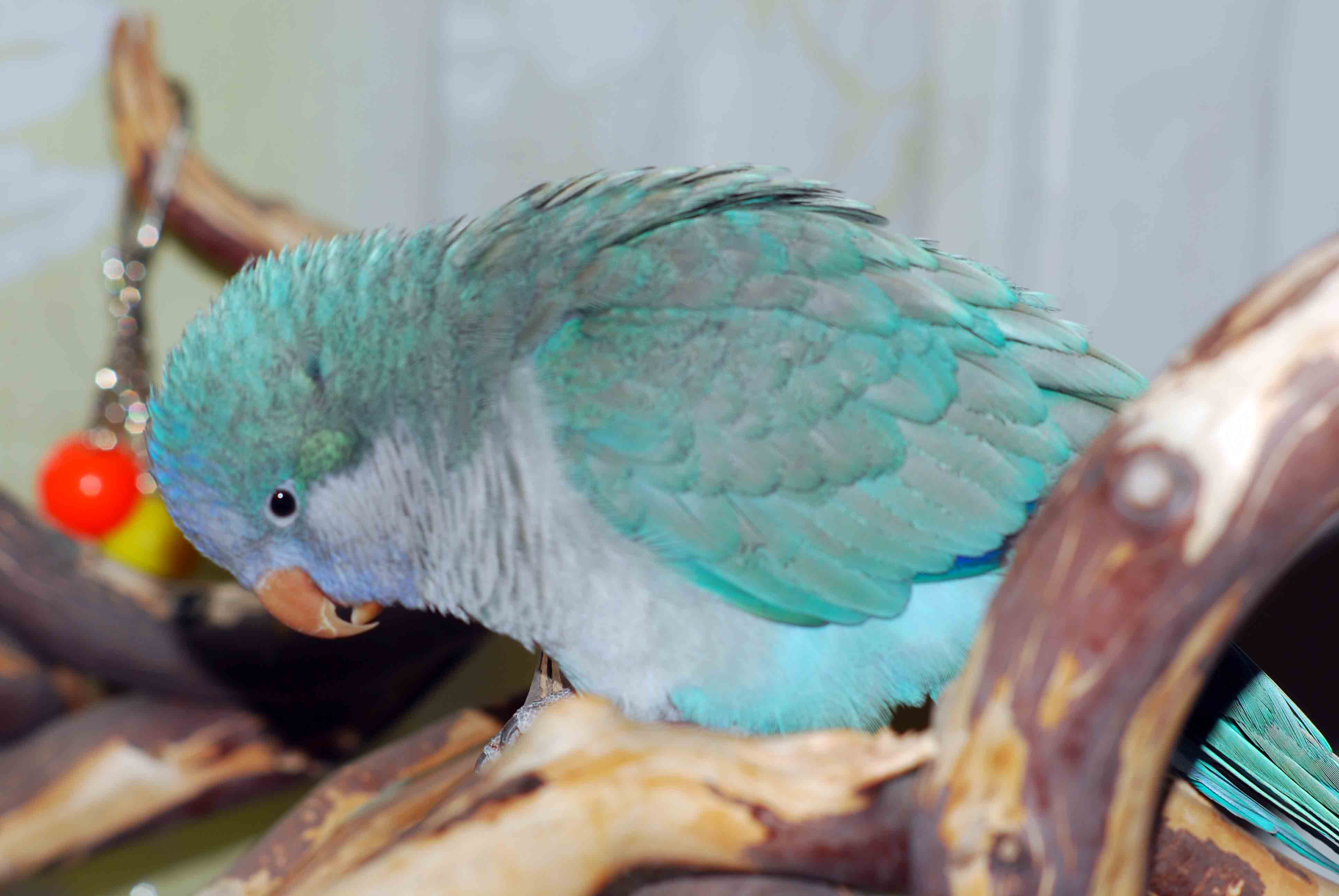
Pet with blue mutation

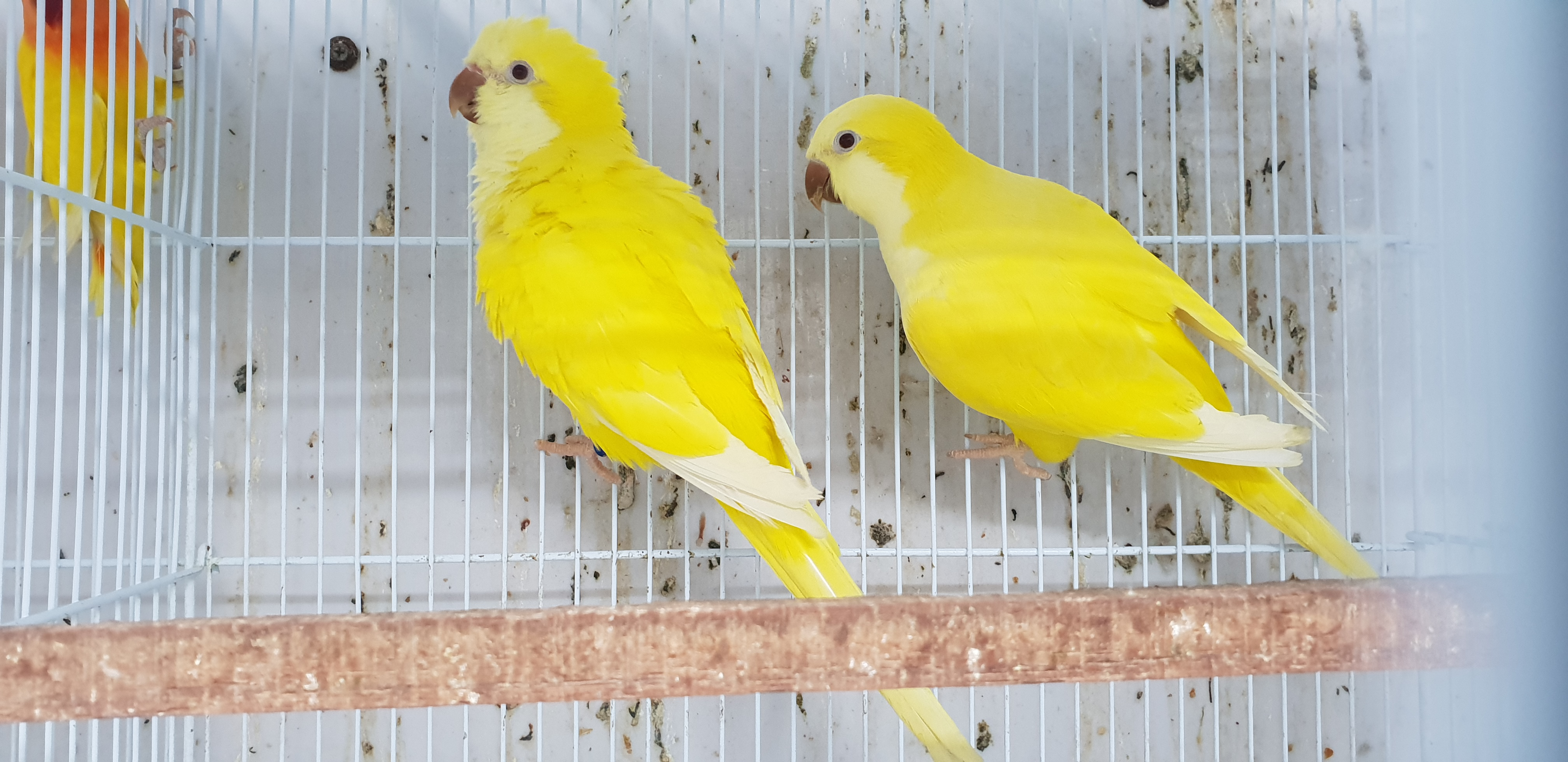
Pets with yellow mutation
