= Rabbit Lake =

Rabbit Lake can refer to:

== Lakes ==
Canada

- Rabbit Lake (Nova Scotia)
- Ontario
  - Rabbit Lake (Algoma District)
  - Rabbit Lake (Muskoka District)
  - Nipissing District
    - Rabbit Lake (Aylen River), in South Algonquin
    - Rabbit Lake (Number One Creek), in West Nipissing
    - Rabbit Lake (Temagami), in the Temagami region
  - Rabbit Lake (Parry Sound District)
  - Rabbit Lake (Sudbury District)

United States

- Rabbit Lake (Minnesota)

== Settlements ==
- Rabbit Lake, Saskatchewan, a village in Saskatchewan, Canada
- Rabbit Lake Township, Minnesota, United States

== Other ==
- Rabbit Lake mine, uranium mine in Saskatchewan, Canada
