= Lux (disambiguation) =

Lux (Latin, 'light') is the SI derived unit of illuminance, which measures the perceived intensity of light.

Lux or LUX may also refer to:

== Arts and entertainment ==
- Lux (Brian Eno album), 2012
- Lux (Gemini Syndrome album), 2013
- Lux (Rosalía album), 2025
- Lux (video game), 2002
- Lux, King of Criminals, a 1929 German silent film
- LUX Magazine, a fashion magazine by PennWell
- Lux Prize, a European Parliament film prize
- Lux Radio Theatre, a former American long-running radio anthology series
- Lux Style Awards, a Pakistani entertainment industry awards ceremony
- Life Unexpected, an American TV series also known as Lux
- "Lux" (Doctor Who), an episode of the 2025 season of Doctor Who

=== In fiction ===
- Lux the Poet, a novel by Martin Millar
- Lux Cassidy, the main protagonist of the American drama television series Life Unexpected
- Lux, a character in the novel and film The Virgin Suicides
- Lux, one of the main protagonists of the Sword Art Online spin-off manga series Sword Art Online: Girls' Ops
- Lux, resources in the video game Kingdom Hearts χ
- Lux, a champion in the video game League of Legends
- Lux, nightclub in the urban fantasy TV series Lucifer

== Businesses and organisations ==
- LUX (British film company), for the promotion of experimental film
- Lux Capital, an American venture capital firm
- Lux Film, an Italian film company
- Lux Industries, an Indian underwear company
- Lux Products, a thermostat brand of EME Americas Inc.
- LUX* Resorts & Hotels, a hotel operator based in Mauritius
- Lux (soap), a global brand developed by Unilever
- Lux, Italian stock exchange ticker for Luxottica, an Italian eyewear conglomerate
- LUX Fight League, a Mexican mixed martial arts promotion

== People ==
- Adam Lux (1765–1793), German revolutionary
- Benedikt Lux (born 1981), German politician
- Bralyn Lux (born 2000), American football player
- Danny Lux (born 1969), American composer
- Gavin Lux (born 1997), American baseball player
- Germán Lux (born 1982), Argentine association footballer
- Gwen Lux (1908–1987), American sculptor
- Josef Lux (1956–1999), Czech politician
- Kazimierz Lux (1780–1846), Polish soldier and pirate
- Loretta Lux (born 1969), German photographer
- Lucien Lux (born 1956), Luxembourgian politician
- Lux Pascal, American-born Chilean actor and activist
- Mary Stuart Lux (1920–2012), American politician
- Mike Lux (born 1960), American political consultant
- Olivia Lux (born 1994), American drag queen
- Thomas Lux (1946–2017), American poet
- Vitalij Lux (born 1989), Kyrgyzstani-German footballer

=== Stage name or pseudonym ===
- Lux Interior (Erick Lee Purkhiser, 1946–2009), American singer
- Luxury Elite (born 1988), also known as Lux, American musician
- Matthew David Graham, online pseudonym Lux, sex offender

== Places ==
- Lux, Côte-d'Or, France
- Lux, Haute-Garonne, France
- Lux, Saône-et-Loire, France
- ISO 3166-1 code for Luxembourg

== Science and technology ==
- LUX, a gene involved in the circadian rhythms of Arabidopsis thaliana
- Conway's LUX method for magic squares, an algorithm for creating magic squares
- Large Underground Xenon experiment, formerly at the Sanford Underground Research Facility, U.S.
- Lux operon, which controls bioluminescence in luminescent bacteria

== Transportation ==
- Lux (Lyft), a level of service from ridesharing company Lyft
- Lux, Nevada, defunct train station, U.S.
- LUX, a series of cars by VinFast
- LUX, the IATA code for Luxembourg Airport, the principal airport of Luxembourg
- LUX, the National Rail code for Luxulyan railway station, Cornwall, UK
- Lux, a gambling ship anchored off the coast of California in the 1940s

== Other uses ==
- Lux, a Danish barley variety

== See also ==
- LX (disambiguation)
- Fiat Lux (disambiguation)
- Lux Aeterna (disambiguation)
- Lux Mundi (disambiguation)
- "400 Lux", a song by Lorde on the Pure Heroine album
- Luxx (disambiguation)
