= Howard Smith =

Howard Smith may refer to:

== Government and politics ==
- H. Alexander Smith (1880–1966), U.S. senator from New Jersey
- Howard E. Smith (Minnesota politician) (1917–2011), American businessman and Minnesota state legislator
- Howard W. Smith (1883–1976), U.S. representative from Virginia
- Howard Smith (diplomat) (1919–1996), British ambassador and director general of MI5, 1979–1981

== Arts and entertainment ==
- Howard Smith (actor) (1893–1968), American actor
- Howard Smith (designer) (1928–2021), American-born Finnish artist and designer
- Howard Smith (director) (1936–2014), American film director, journalist and broadcaster
- Howie Smith (born 1943), musician
- Howard Everett Smith (1885–1970), American painter
- Howard Philips Smith (born 1956), American writer, novelist, and photographer

== Other ==
- Howard Alan Smith, astrophysicist and author
- Howard Bradley Smith (1894–?), American author
- Howard Dwight Smith (1886–1958), American architect
- Howard K. Smith (1914–2002), American journalist
- Howard Smith (footballer) (1878–1909), Australian footballer for St Kilda
- Howard Van Smith (1909–1987), American journalist
- Skippy Smith (Howard Smith, 1913–2003), American stunt skydiver, pilot, and entrepreneur
- Howard Smith (bobsleigh) (born 1956), British Olympic bobsledder
- Howard Smith (company), former Australian industrial company
