= Cuyuna, Minnesota =

City in Minnesota, United States

Cuyuna
- City
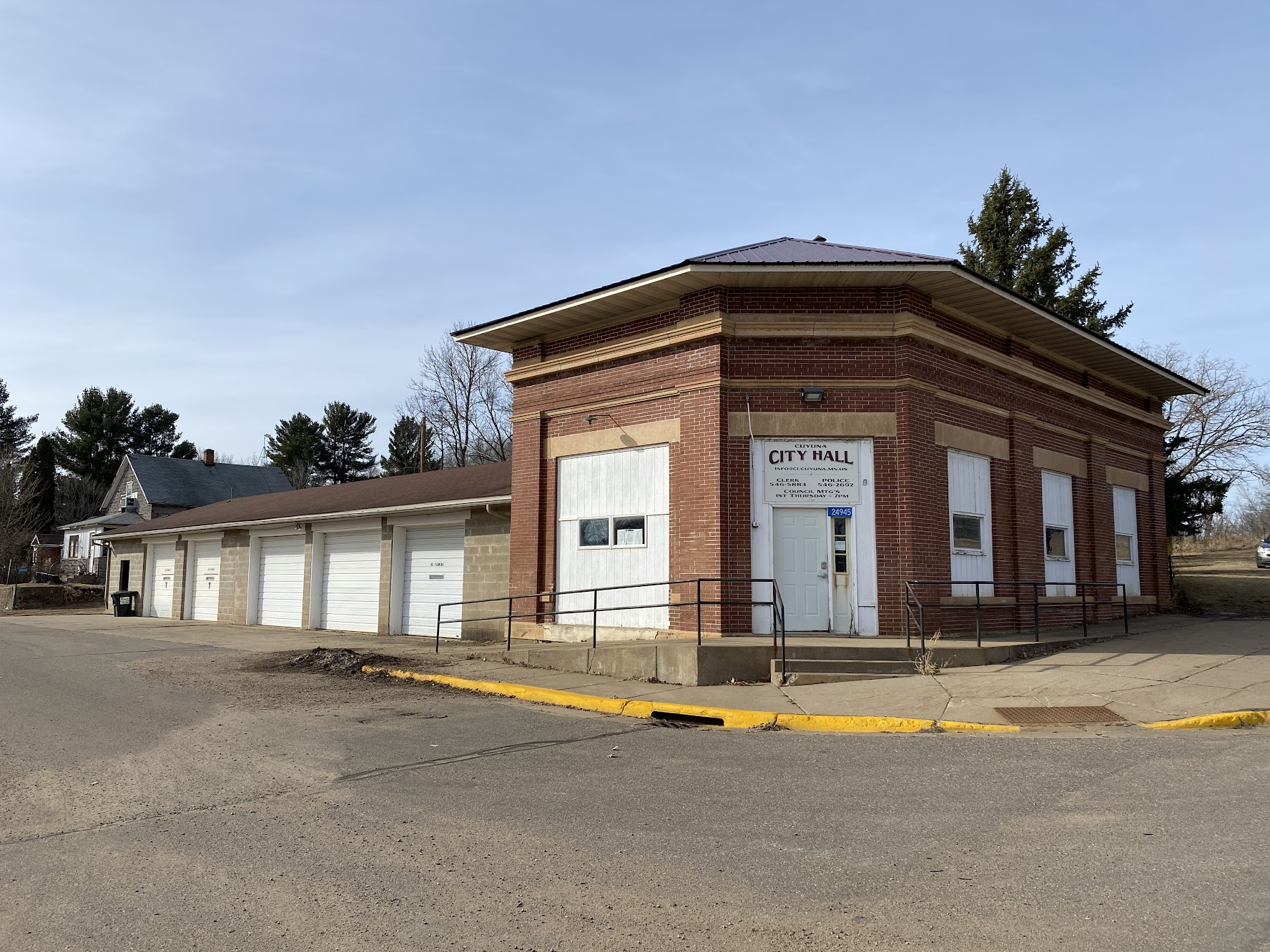
- City Hall of Cuyuna, part of the NRHP

- Location of Cuyuna within Crow Wing County, Minnesota
- Coordinates: 46°30′40″N 93°55′36″W
- Country: United States
- State: Minnesota
- County: Crow Wing

Area
  - Total: 3.38 sq mi (8.75 km^{2})
  - Land: 3.24 sq mi (8.38 km^{2})
  - Water: 0.14 sq mi (0.37 km^{2})
- Elevation: 1,288 ft (393 m)

Population (2020)
  - Total: 296
  - Density: 91.5/sq mi (35.33/km^{2})
- Time zone: UTC-6 (Central (CST))
  - Summer (DST): UTC-5 (CDT)
- ZIP code: 56444
- Area code: 218
- FIPS code: 27-14428
- GNIS feature ID: 2393702
- Website: www.ci.cuyuna.mn.us

Cuyuna (/kaɪˈjuːnə/ kye-YOO-nə) is a city in Crow Wing County, Minnesota, United States. As of the 2020 census, Cuyuna had a population of 296. It is part of the Brainerd Micropolitan Statistical Area.

The city lies within its namesake, the Cuyuna Range, a line of iron-bearing hills in central Minnesota. Cuyuna was one of the mining towns along the range, part of a list including Crosby, Ironton, Trommald, and Manganese. The Cuyuna iron range saw its heyday in the first half of the 20th century, and mining on the range ceased in 1984. The local economy is now dependent upon tourism from mountain bikers. Cuyuna has been declared to have the best trail systems in Minnesota as of 2014. The Cuyuna Country State Recreation Area now encompasses some of the range.

Cuyuna is located within ZIP code 56444 based in Deerwood.

== History ==
Cuyuna was incorporated in 1910. Cuyuna, and the iron ore range on which it is situated, were named by and for Cuyler Adams, and for his dog, Una, who accompanied him in many lone prospecting trips. Cuyler Adams was a prospector, discoverer, and then mine owner of the Cuyuna range. Cuyler Adams affirmed the discovery of workable ore deposits nearby, and credited jointly to himself and the valuable aid of Una.

The Rabbit Lake Band of Mississippi Chippewa historically lived in the Cuyuna area. Under the authority of the 1855 Treaty of Washington (10 Stat. 1165), the Rabbit Lake Indian Reservation was established, encompassing an area from where Riverton to Cuyuna are located. After the Dakota War of 1862, majority of the Rabbit Lake Band were removed to the area about Leech Lake and eventually to the White Earth Indian Reservation, and minority of the remaining Rabbit Lake Band members amalgamating with the Mille Lacs Band of Ojibwe to their south. After they were removed there was little settlement in the area until the beginning of a mining village named Cuyuna in 1906. Cuyuna was platted in November 1908.

== Geography ==
According to the United States Census Bureau, the city has a total area of 3.53 square miles (9.14 km^{2}), of which 3.28 square miles (8.50 km^{2}) is land and 0.25 square miles (0.65 km^{2}) is water.

Crow Wing County Road 31 serves as a main route in the community. Nearby routes include State Highways 6 (MN 6) and 210 (MN 210), and County Road 30.

The community is located south of Rabbit Lake. The town of Crosby and the Cuyuna Country State Recreation Area are approximately three miles to the south-southwest.

== Demographics ==
Historical population
Census	Pop.	Note	%±
1920	417		—
1930	266		−36.2%
1940	176		−33.8%
1950	112		−36.4%
1960	86		−23.2%
1970	82		−4.7%
1980	157		91.5%
1990	172		9.6%
2000	231		34.3%
2010	332		43.7%
2020	296		−10.8%
U.S. Decennial Census

=== 2010 census ===
As of the census of 2010, there were 332 people, 126 households, and 88 families living in the city. The population density was 101.2 inhabitants per square mile (39.1/km^{2}). There were 162 housing units at an average density of 49.4 per square mile (19.1/km^{2}). The racial makeup of the city was 97.6% White, 1.5% African American, 0.3% Asian, and 0.6% from two or more races.

There were 126 households, of which 31.7% had children under the age of 18 living with them, 54.8% were married couples living together, 7.9% had a female householder with no husband present, 7.1% had a male householder with no wife present, and 30.2% were non-families. 26.2% of all households were made up of individuals, and 6.4% had someone living alone who was 65 years of age or older. The average household size was 2.63 and the average family size was 3.22.

The median age in the city was 39.5 years. 30.1% of residents were under the age of 18; 4.1% were between the ages of 18 and 24; 23.1% were from 25 to 44; 27.9% were from 45 to 64; and 14.5% were 65 years of age or older. The gender makeup of the city was 54.5% male and 45.5% female.

=== 2000 census ===
At the 2000 census, there were 231 people, 90 households and 64 families living in the city. The population density was 70.6 inhabitants per square mile (27.3/km^{2}). There were 113 housing units at an average density of 34.5 per square mile (13.3/km^{2}). The racial makeup of the city was 98.70% White, 0.87% African American, and 0.43% from two or more races. Hispanic or Latino of any race were 0.43% of the population. 33.3% were of German, 11.8% American, 8.7% Swedish, 7.7% Norwegian, 7.2% Irish and 6.7% Italian ancestry according to Census 2000.

There were 90 households, of which 30.0% had children under the age of 18 living with them, 61.1% were married couples living together, 5.6% had a female householder with no husband present, and 27.8% were non-families. 22.2% of all households were made up of individuals, and 6.7% had someone living alone who was 65 years of age or older. The average household size was 2.57 and the average family size was 2.95.

26.8% of the population were under the age of 18, 6.9% from 18 to 24, 26.8% from 25 to 44, 26.0% from 45 to 64, and 13.4% who were 65 years of age or older. The median age was 39 years. For every 100 females, there were 106.3 males. For every 100 females age 18 and over, there were 108.6 males.

The median household income was $44,107 and the median family income was $48,750. Males had a median income of $38,000 versus $29,500 for females. The per capita income for the city was $17,838. About 7.6% of families and 10.0% of the population were below the poverty line, including 4.9% of those under the age of eighteen and 18.4% of those 65 or over.
