= Let There Be Light =

Let There Be Light may refer to:

== Literature ==
- "Let there be light", a phrase from English translations of a line of the Bible
- Genesis 1:3, the line from the Bible saying "let there be light"
- Let There Be Light, novel by Paruyr Sevak 1969
- Let There Be Light (Howard Smith book), a book by Howard Alan Smith
- "Let There Be Light" (Heinlein short story), a 1940 short story by Robert A. Heinlein
- "Let There Be Light" (Clarke short story), a 1957 short story by Arthur C. Clarke

== Film and television ==
- Let There Be Light (1917 film), a German silent drama film
- Let There Be Light (1946 film), directed by John Huston
- Let There Be Light (1998 film), directed by Arthur Joffé
- Let There Be Light (2007 film), a 2007 Israeli documentary film
- Let There Be Light (2017 film), religious drama film directed by and starring Kevin Sorbo
- Let There Be Light (2019 film), a Slovak-language film, directed by Marko Škop
- "Let There Be Light" (SATC episode), an episode of Sex and the City
- "Let There Be Light" (Hercules: The Legendary Journeys), a Season 5 episode of the TV series
- "Let There Be Light", an episode of Rugrats
- "Let There Be Light", an episode of the 2004 British documentary series Light Fantastic

== Music ==
- "Let There Be Light", Symphony for organ No. 2 by Frederik Magle
- Let There Be Light (album), a 2016 album by Hillsong Worship
- "Let There Be Light" (album), a 2021 album by Sun Atoms

=== Songs ===
- "Let There Be Light" (song), a 1995 song by Mike Oldfield from The Songs of Distant Earth
- "Let There Be Light", a song by Belladonna
- "Let There Be Light", a song by 21st Century Schizoid Band from Live in Italy
- "Let There Be Light", an instrumental by Justice from Cross
- "Let There Be Light", a song by Nas from Hip Hop Is Dead
- "Let There Be Light", a song by The Qemists
- "Let There Be Light", a 2025 song for the Friday Night Funkin' mod "Hit Single"

== Visual art ==
- "Let There Be Light", a stained glass installation by Abraham Rattner at Loop Synagogue in Chicago

== See also ==
- "Let There Be More Light", a 1968 song by Pink Floyd
- Fiat Lux (disambiguation)
- And There Was Light, a 2002 biography of Abraham Lincoln by Jon Meacham
