= Serpent Lake =

Lake in the state of Minnesota, United States

- Location within Minnesota
- Location: Crow Wing County, Minnesota
- Coordinates: 46°28′50″N 93°55′27″W
- Type: Lake
- Surface area: 1,103 acres (446 ha)
- Max. depth: 65 ft (20 m)
- Shore length^{1}: 8.9 mi (14.3 km)
- Settlements: Crosby, Deerwood
- ^{1} Shore length is not a well-defined measure.

Serpent Lake is a lake in Crosby and Deerwood, Crow Wing County, in the U.S. state of Minnesota spanning 1,103 acres. Fish that swim there include: Black Bullhead, Bluegill, Brown Bullhead, Largemouth Bass, Northern Pike, Pumpkinseed, Rock Bass, Smallmouth Bass, Walleye, Yellow Bullhead and Yellow Perch. Serpent Lake is an English translation of the Ojibwe language name.

== See also ==
- List of lakes in Minnesota
