= Astrophysical maser =

Natural source of microwave radiation emission

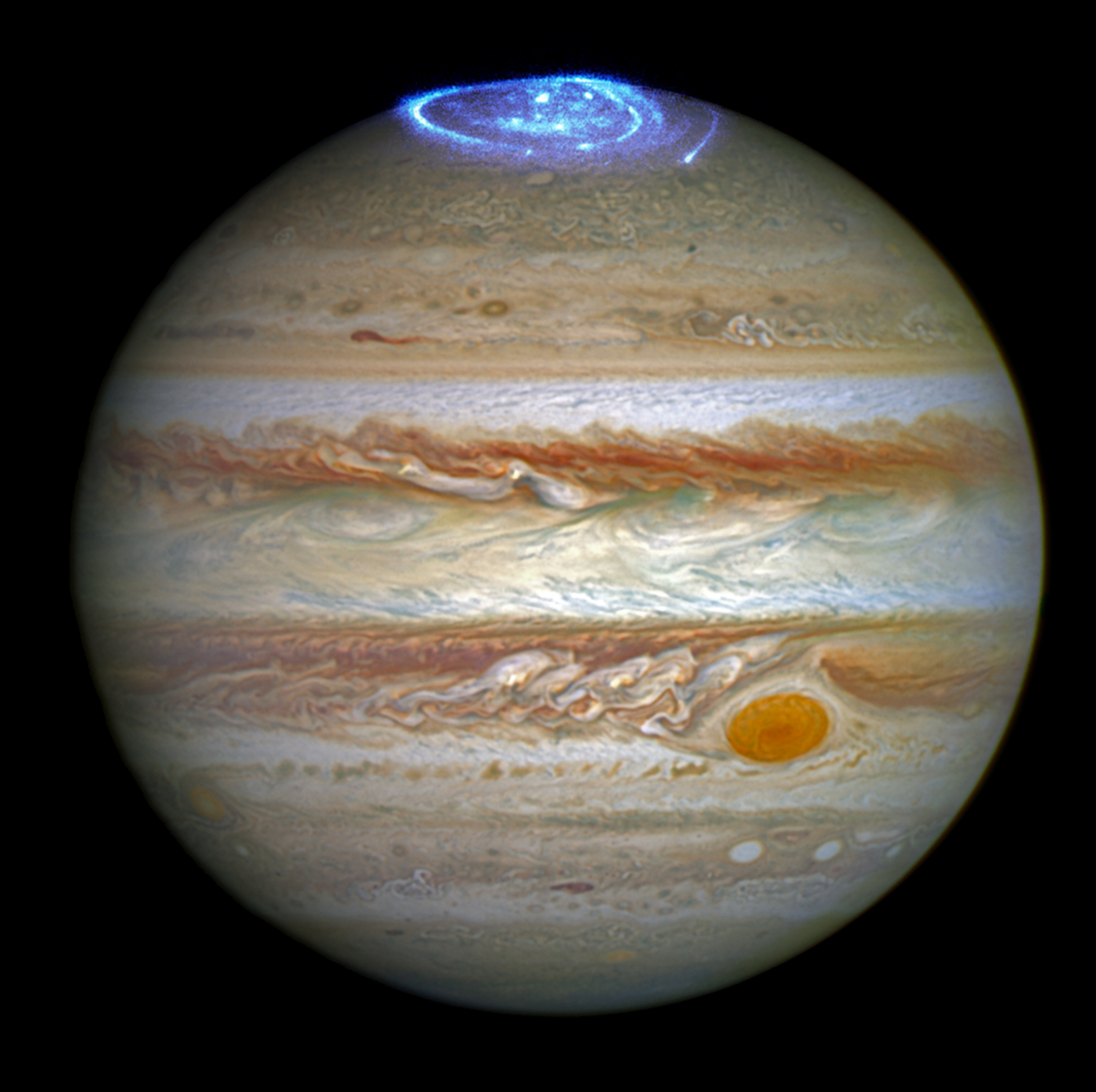
Aurorae on the north pole of Jupiter generate cyclotron masers (Hubble)

An astrophysical maser is a naturally occurring source of stimulated spectral line emission, typically in the microwave portion of the electromagnetic spectrum. This emission may arise in molecular clouds, comets, planetary atmospheres, stellar atmospheres, or various other conditions in interstellar space.

== Background ==
=== Discrete transition energy ===
Like a laser, the emission from a maser is stimulated (or seeded) and monochromatic, having the frequency corresponding to the energy difference between two quantum-mechanical energy levels of the species in the gain medium which have been pumped into a non-thermal population distribution. However, naturally occurring masers lack the resonant cavity engineered for terrestrial laboratory masers. The emission from an astrophysical maser is due to a single pass through the gain medium and therefore generally lacks the spatial coherence and mode purity expected from a laboratory maser.

=== Nomenclature ===
It is often stated that astrophysical masers are not "true" masers because they lack these oscillation cavities. However, the distinction between oscillator-based lasers and single-pass lasers was intentionally disregarded by the laser community in the early years of the technology.

This fundamental incongruency in language has resulted in the use of other paradoxical definitions in the field. For example, if the gain medium of a misaligned laser is emission-seeded but non-oscillating radiation, it is said to emit amplified spontaneous emission or ASE. This ASE is regarded as unwanted or parasitic. Some researchers would add to this definition the presence of insufficient feedback or unmet lasing threshold: that is, the users wish the system to behave as a laser. The emission from astrophysical masers is, in fact, ASE but is sometimes termed superradiant emission to differentiate it from the laboratory phenomenon. This simply adds to the confusion, since both sources are superradiant. In some laboratory lasers, such as a single pass through a regeneratively amplified Ti:Sapph stage, the physics is directly analogous to an amplified ray in an astrophysical maser.

Furthermore, the practical limits of the use of the m to stand for microwave in maser are variously employed. For example, when lasers were initially developed in the visible portion of the spectrum, they were called optical masers. Charles Townes advocated that the m stand for molecule, since energy states of molecules generally provide the masing transition. Along these lines, some use the term laser to describe any system that exploits an electronic transition and the term maser to describe a system that exploits a rotational or vibrational transition, regardless of the output frequency. Some astrophysicists use the term iraser to describe a maser emitting at a wavelength of a few micrometres, even though the optics community terms similar sources lasers.

The term taser has been used to describe laboratory masers in the terahertz regime, although astronomers might call these sub-millimeter masers and laboratory physicists generally call these gas lasers or specifically alcohol lasers in reference to the gain species. The electrical engineering community typically limits the use of the word microwave to frequencies between roughly 1 GHz and 300 GHz; that is, wavelengths between 30 cm and 1 mm, respectively.

=== Astrophysical conditions ===
The simple existence of a pumped population inversion is not sufficient for the observation of a maser. For example, there must be velocity coherence along the line of sight so that Doppler shifting does not prevent inverted states in different parts of the gain medium from radiatively coupling. While polarisation in laboratory lasers and masers may be achieved by selectively oscillating the desired modes, polarisation in natural masers will arise only in the presence of a polarisation-state–dependent pump or of a magnetic field in the gain medium.

The radiation from astrophysical masers can be quite weak and may escape detection due to the limited sensitivity, and relative remoteness, of astronomical observatories and due to the sometimes overwhelming spectral absorption from unpumped molecules of the maser species in the surrounding space. This latter obstacle may be partially surmounted through the judicious use of the spatial filtering inherent in interferometric techniques, especially very long baseline interferometry (VLBI).

The study of masers provides valuable information on the conditions—temperature, density, magnetic field, and velocity—in environments of stellar birth and death and the centres of galaxies containing black holes, leading to refinements in existing theoretical models.

== Discovery ==
=== Historical background ===
In 1965 an unexpected discovery was made by Weaver et al.: emission lines in space, of unknown origin, at a frequency of 1665 MHz. At this time many researchers still thought that molecules could not exist in space, even though they had been discovered by McKellar in the 1940s, and so the emission was at first attributed to a hypothetical form of interstellar matter named "mysterium", but the emission was soon identified as line emission from hydroxide molecules in compact sources within molecular clouds. More discoveries followed, with water emission in 1969, methanol emission in 1970, and silicon monoxide emission in 1974, all emanating from within molecular clouds. These were termed masers, as from their narrow line widths and high effective temperatures it became clear that these sources were amplifying microwave radiation.

Masers were then discovered around highly evolved late-type stars, named OH/IR stars. First was hydroxide emission in 1968, then water emission in 1969 and silicon monoxide emission in 1974. Masers were discovered in external galaxies in 1973, and in the Solar System in comet halos.

Another unexpected discovery was made in 1982 with the discovery of emission from an extra-galactic source with an unrivalled luminosity about 10^{6} times larger than any previous source. This was termed a megamaser because of its great luminosity; many more megamasers have since been discovered.

A weak disk maser was discovered in 1995 emanating from the star MWC 349A, using NASA's Kuiper Airborne Observatory.

Evidence for an anti-pumped (dasar) sub-thermal population in the 4830 MHz transition of formaldehyde (H_{2}CO) was observed in 1969 by Palmer et al.

=== Detection ===
The connections of maser activity with far infrared (FIR) emission has been used to conduct searches of the sky with optical telescopes (because optical telescopes are easier to use for searches of this kind), and likely objects are then checked in the radio spectrum. Particularly targeted are molecular clouds, OH-IR stars, and FIR active galaxies.

=== Known interstellar species ===
The following species have been observed in stimulated emission from astronomical environments:

- OH
- CH
- H_{2}CO
- H_{2}O
- NH_{3}, ^{15}NH_{3}
- CH_{3}OH
- HNCNH
- SiS
- HC_{3}N
- SiO, ^{29}SiO, ^{30}SiO
- HCN, H^{13}CN
- H (in MWC 349)
- CS

== Characteristics of maser radiation ==
The amplification or gain of radiation passing through a maser cloud is exponential. This has consequences for the radiation it produces:

=== Beaming ===
Small path differences across the irregularly shaped maser cloud become greatly distorted by exponential gain. Part of the cloud that has a slightly longer path length than the rest will appear much brighter (as it is the exponent of the path length that is relevant), and so maser spots are typically much smaller than their parent clouds. The majority of the radiation will emerge along this line of greatest path length in a "beam"; this is termed beaming.

=== Rapid variability ===
As the gain of a maser depends exponentially on the population inversion and the velocity-coherent path length, any variation of either will itself result in exponential change of the maser output.

=== Line narrowing ===
Exponential gain also amplifies the centre of the line shape (Gaussian or Lorentzian, etc.) more than the edges or wings. This results in an emission line shape that is much taller but not much wider. This makes the line appear narrower relative to the unamplified line.

=== Saturation ===
The exponential growth in intensity of radiation passing through a maser cloud continues as long as pumping processes can maintain the population inversion against the growing losses by stimulated emission. While this is so the maser is said to be unsaturated. However, after a point, the population inversion cannot be maintained any longer and the maser becomes saturated. In a saturated maser, amplification of radiation depends linearly on the size of population inversion and the path length. Saturation of one transition in a maser can affect the degree of inversion in other transitions in the same maser, an effect known as competitive gain.

=== High brightness ===
The brightness temperature of a maser is the temperature a black body would have if producing the same emission brightness at the wavelength of the maser. That is, if an object had a temperature of about 10^{9}K it would produce as much 1665-MHz radiation as a strong interstellar OH maser. Of course, at 10^{9}K the OH molecule would dissociate (kT is greater than the bond energy), so the brightness temperature is not indicative of the kinetic temperature of the maser gas but is nevertheless useful in describing maser emission. Masers have incredible effective temperatures, many around 10^{9}K, but some of up to 10^{12}K and even 10^{14}K.

=== Polarisation ===
An important aspect of maser study is polarisation of the emission. Astronomical masers are often very highly polarised, sometimes 100% (in the case of some OH masers) in a circular fashion, and to a lesser degree in a linear fashion. This polarisation is due to some combination of the Zeeman effect, magnetic beaming of the maser radiation, and anisotropic pumping which favours certain magnetic-state transitions.

Many of the characteristics of megamaser emission are different.

== Maser environments ==
=== Comets ===
Comets are small bodies (5 to 15 km diameter) of frozen volatiles (e.g., water, carbon dioxide, ammonia, and methane) embedded in a crusty silicate filler that orbit the Sun in eccentric orbits. As they approach the Sun, the volatiles vaporise to form a halo and later a tail around the nucleus. Once vaporised, these molecules can form inversions and mase.

The impact of comet Shoemaker-Levy 9 with Jupiter in 1994 resulted in maser emissions in the 22 GHz region from the water molecule. Despite the apparent rarity of these events, observation of the intense maser emission has been suggested as a detection scheme for extrasolar planets.

Ultraviolet light from the Sun breaks down some water molecules to form hydroxides that can mase. In 1997, 1667-MHz maser emission characteristic of hydroxide was observed from comet Hale-Bopp.

=== Planetary atmospheres ===
It is predicted that masers exist in the atmospheres of gas giant planets. Such masers would be highly variable due to planetary rotation (10-hour period for Jovian planets). Cyclotron masers have been detected at the north pole of Jupiter.

=== Planetary systems ===
In 2009, S. V. Pogrebenko et al. reported the detection of water masers in the plumes of water associated with the Saturnian moons Hyperion, Titan, Enceladus, and Atlas.

=== Stellar atmospheres ===
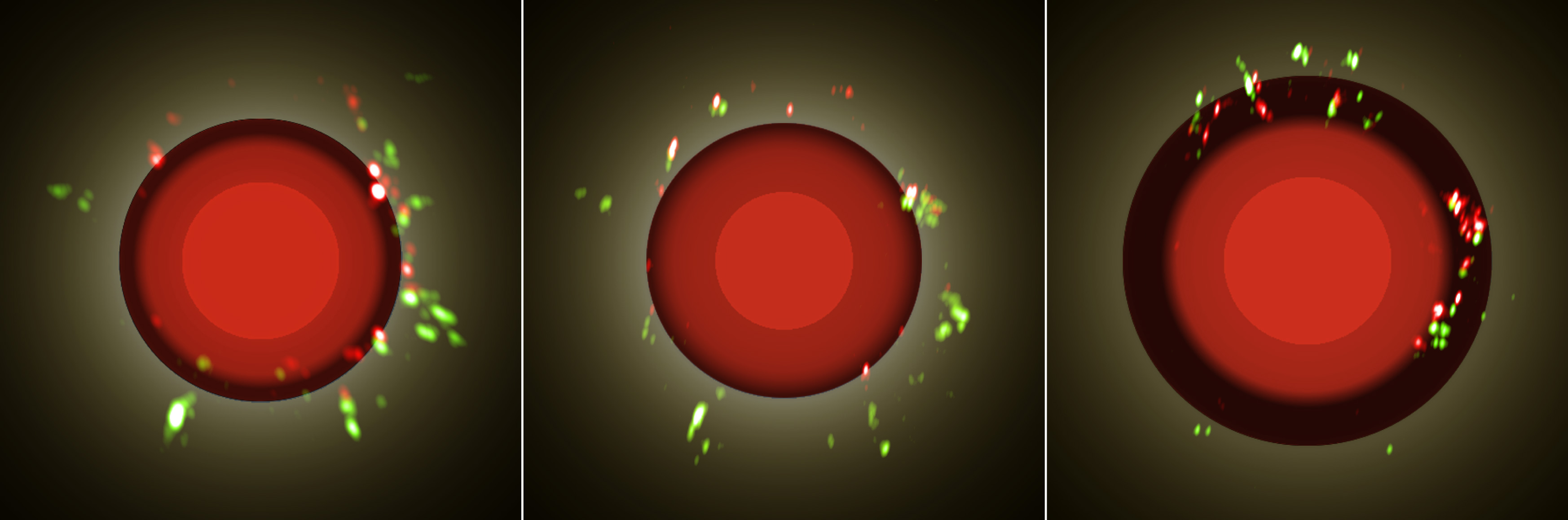
Pulsations of the Mira variable S Orionis, showing dust production and masers (ESO)

The conditions in the atmospheres of late-type stars support the pumping of different maser species at different distances from the star. Due to instabilities within the nuclear burning sections of the star, the star experiences periods of increased energy release. These pulses produce a shockwave that forces the atmosphere outward. Hydroxyl masers occur at a distance of about 1,000 to 10,000 astronomical units (AU), water masers at a distance of about 100 to 400 AU, and silicon monoxide masers at a distance of about 5 to 10 AU.

Both radiative and collisional pumping resulting from the shockwave have been suggested as the pumping mechanism for the silicon monoxide masers. These masers diminish for larger radii as the gaseous silicon monoxide condenses into dust, depleting the available maser molecules. For the water masers, the inner and outer radii limits roughly correspond to the density limits for maser operation. At the inner boundary, the collisions between molecules are enough to remove a population inversion. At the outer boundary, the density and optical depth is low enough that the gain of the maser is diminished. The hydroxyl masers are supported chemical pumping. At the distances where these masers are found water molecules are disassociated by UV radiation.

=== Star-forming regions ===
Young stellar objects and (ultra)compact H II regions embedded in molecular clouds and giant molecular clouds, support the bulk of astrophysical masers. Various pumping schemes – both radiative and collisional and combinations thereof – result in the maser emission of multiple transitions of many species. For example, the OH molecule has been observed to mase at 1612, 1665, 1667, 1720, 4660, 4750, 4765, 6031, 6035, and 13441 MHz. Water and methanol masers are also typical of these environments. Relatively rare masers such as ammonia and formaldehyde may also be found in star-forming regions.

=== Supernova remnants ===
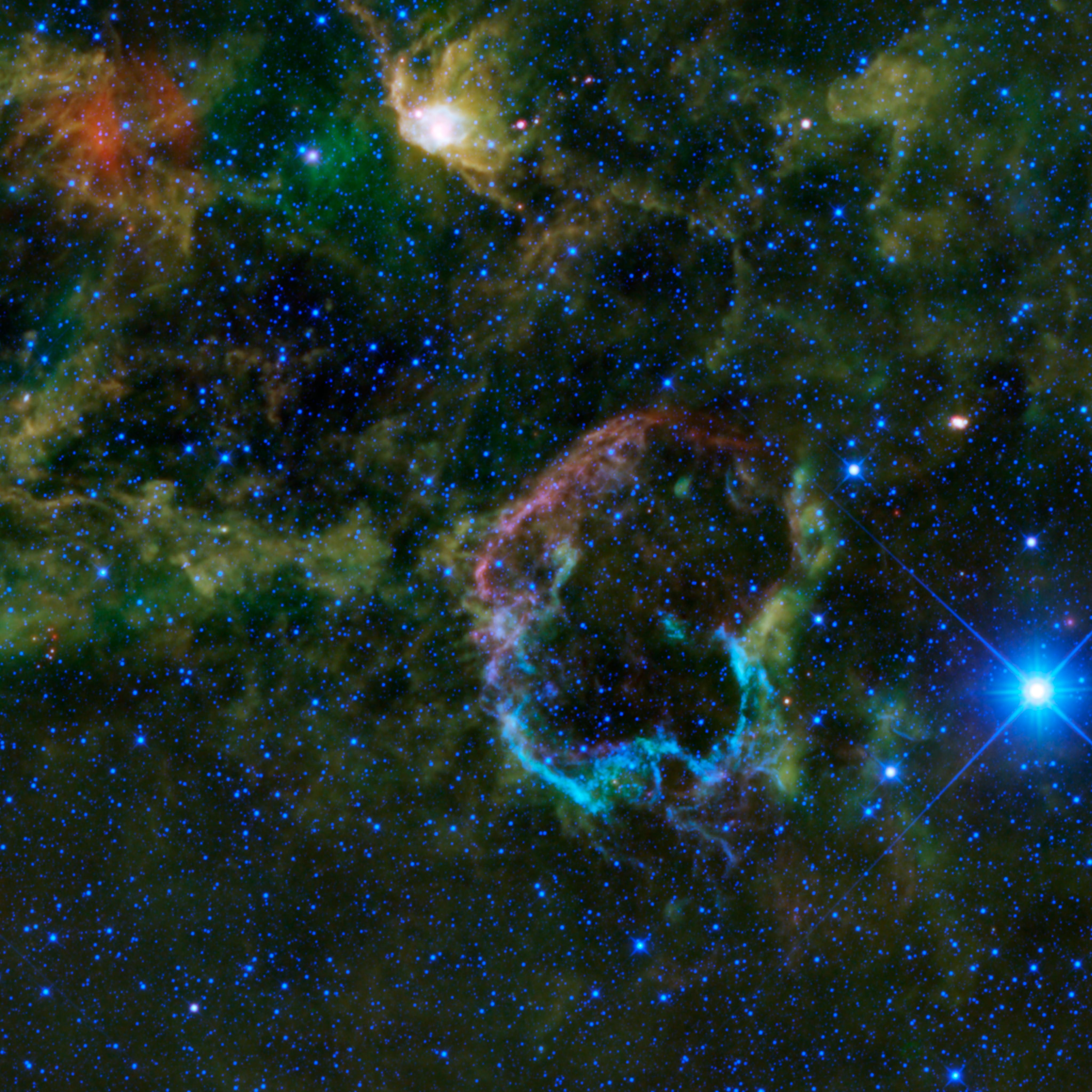
WISE image of IC 443, a supernova remnant with maser emission

The 1720 MHz maser transition of hydroxide is known to be associated with supernova remnants that interact with molecular clouds.

=== Extragalactic sources ===
While some of the masers in star forming regions can achieve luminosities sufficient for detection from external galaxies (such as the nearby Magellanic Clouds), masers observed from distant galaxies generally arise in wholly different conditions. Some galaxies possess central black holes into which a disk of molecular material (about 0.5 parsec in size) is falling. Excitations of these molecules in the disk or in a jet can result in megamasers with large luminosities. Hydroxyl, water, and formaldehyde masers are known to exist in these conditions.

== Ongoing research ==
Astronomical masers remain an active field of research in radio astronomy and laboratory astrophysics due, in part, to the fact that they are valuable diagnostic tools for astrophysical environments which may otherwise elude rigorous quantitative study and because they may facilitate the study of conditions which are inaccessible in terrestrial laboratories. A global collaboration called the Maser Monitoring Organisation, colloquially known as the M2O, are one prominent group of researchers in this discipline.

=== Variability ===
Maser variability is generally understood to mean the change in apparent brightness to the observer. Intensity variations can occur on timescales from days to years indicating limits on maser size and excitation scheme. However, masers change in various ways over various timescales.

=== Distance determinations ===
Masers in star-forming regions are known to move across the sky along with the material that is flowing out from the forming star(s). Also, since the emission is a narrow spectral line, line-of-sight velocity can be determined from the Doppler shift variation of the observed frequency of the maser, permitting a three-dimensional mapping of the dynamics of the maser environment. Perhaps the most spectacular success of this technique is the dynamical determination of the distance to the galaxy NGC 4258 from the analysis of the motion of the masers in the black-hole disk. Also, water masers have been used to estimate the distance and proper motion of galaxies in the Local Group, including that of the Triangulum Galaxy.

VLBI observations of maser sources in late type stars and star forming regions provide determinations of their trigonometric parallax and therefore their distance. This method is much more accurate than other distance determinations, and gives us information about the galactic distance scale, e.g. the distance of spiral arms.

=== Open issues ===
Unlike terrestrial lasers and masers for which the excitation mechanism is known and engineered, the reverse is true for astrophysical masers. In general, astrophysical masers are discovered empirically then studied further in order to develop plausible suggestions about possible pumping schemes. Quantification of the transverse size, spatial and temporal variations, and polarisation state, typically requiring VLBI telemetry, are all useful in the development of a pump theory. Galactic formaldehyde masing is one such example that remains problematic.

On the other hand, some masers have been predicted to occur theoretically but have yet to be observed in nature. For example, the magnetic dipole transitions of the OH molecule near 53 MHz are expected to occur but have yet to be observed, perhaps due to a lack of sensitive equipment.

== See also ==
- Interstellar medium – Matter and radiation in the space between the star systems in a galaxy

== Notes ==
- Weaver H., Dieter N.H., Williams D.R.W., Lum W.T. 1965 Nature 208 29–31
- Davis R.D., Rowson B., Booth R.S., Cooper A.J., Gent H., Adgie R.L., Crowther J.H. 1967 Nature 213 1109–10
- Cheung A.C., Rank D.M., Townes C.H., Thornton D.D., Welch W.J., Crowther J.H. 1969 Nature 221 626–8
- Snyder L.E., Buhl D. 1974 Astrophys. J. 189 L31–33
- Ball J.A., Gottlieb C.A., Lilley A.E., Radford H.E. 1970 Astrophys. J. 162 L203–10
- Wilson W.J., Darrett A.H. 1968 Science 161 778–9
- Knowles S.H., Mayer C.H., Cheung A.E., Rank D.M., Townes C.H. 1969 Science 163 1055–57
- Buhl D., Snyder L.E., Lovas F.J., Johnson D.R. 1974 Astrophys. J. 192 L97–100
- Whiteoak J.B., Gardner F.F. 1973 Astrophys. Lett. 15 211–5
- Baan W.A., Wood P.A.D., Haschick A.D. 1982 Astrophys. J. 260 L49–52
- Cohen R.J. Rep. Prog. Phys. 1989 52 881–943
- Elitzur M. Annu. Rev. Astron. Astrophys. 1992 30 75–112
