= Deerwood Auditorium =

Community center in Deerwood, Minnesota, United States

- U.S. National Register of Historic Places
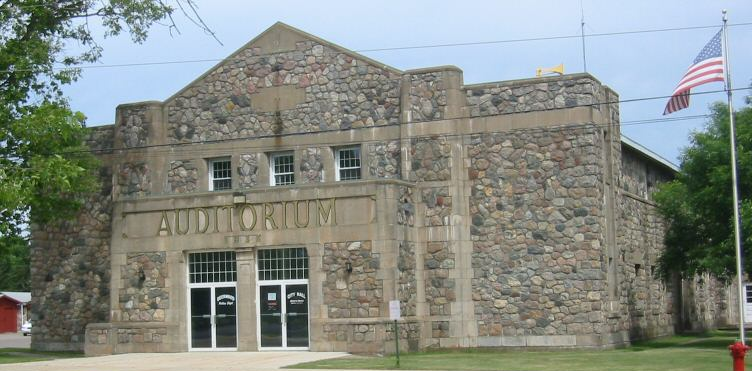
- The Deerwood Auditorium from the south

- Location within Minnesota Location within the United States
- Location: 27 East Forest Road, Deerwood, Minnesota
- Coordinates: 46°28′30″N 93°53′59″W
- Area: Less than one acre
- Built: 1935–1937
- Architect: Carl H. Buetow, Works Progress Administration
- Architectural style: Moderne
- NRHP reference No.: 95001376
- Designated: November 29, 1995

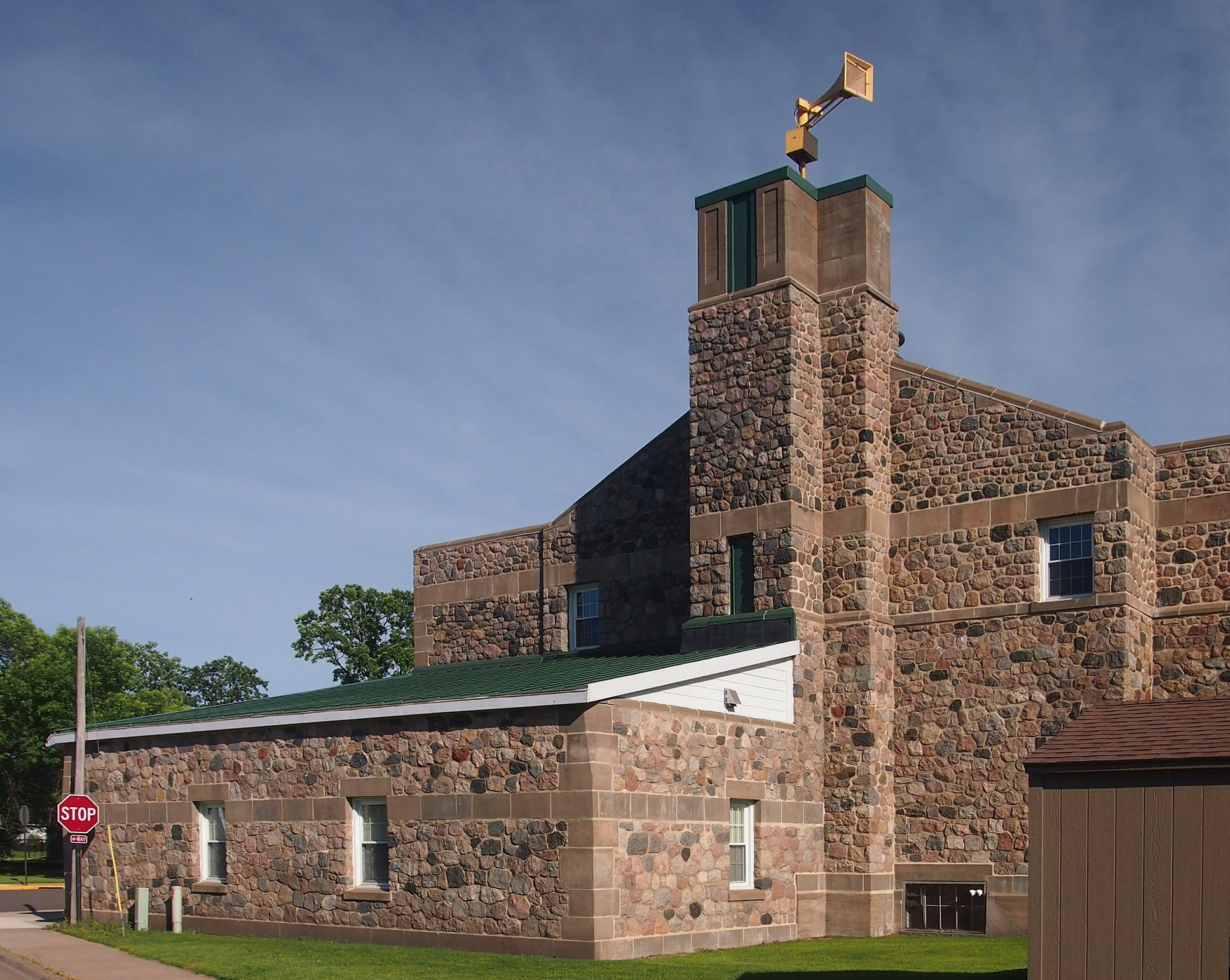
Rear of the Deerwood Auditorium

The Deerwood Auditorium is a community center in Deerwood, Minnesota, United States. It was built as a New Deal project from 1935 to 1937. In 1995 the auditorium was listed on the National Register of Historic Places for its local significance in the themes of architecture, politics/government, and social history. It was nominated for being an exemplary multipurpose municipal building funded by the New Deal, as well as Minnesota's largest project by the State Emergency Relief Administration, and a longstanding venue for community events.

== Description ==
The Deerwood Auditorium is a large, rectangular, two-story building. It features reinforced concrete walls faced with split fieldstone and Moderne-style cast stone trim. A medium-pitch gable roof completes the building. The facility became home to Deerwood's city council, public library, fire equipment, and later the police department. A gymnasium with a stage on the north end doubles as an auditorium. The second floor contains a balcony on either side of the auditorium, while the first floor also houses a kitchen and locker rooms. These spaces allowed the building to be used for a variety of purposes. Sporting events, community meetings, plays, and banquets have all been held in the building. Other events have included lectures, company meetings, exhibits, fraternal gatherings, and graduations.

== Origin ==
Village officials had been discussing building a community hall in 1933, but during the Great Depression, the town was strapped for cash. Beriah Magoffin Jr., a local resident, secured an option on a lot occupied by the Hilyar Oil Station. He donated it to the village for the auditorium. He had also bought a building from the Evergreen Mining Company located at the Meacham Mine. The structure could be dismantled and its materials used for a new building.

There was however, still a need for funds to actually build the structure. Fortunately, President Franklin D. Roosevelt had launched federal programs to build lasting infrastructure improvements while providing employment and economic relief. In a special session on October 9, 1934, the Deerwood Village Council met with Fred Pfeifer, the supervising architect of the State Emergency Relief Administration (SERA), to discuss the construction of the building.

The auditorium was designed by Carl H. Buetow, who had worked for a while under Clarence H. Johnston, Sr., a notable civic architect in Minnesota. Many local materials were used in an effort to save on costs. In particular, local men collected nearly 800 tons of fieldstone for the facing of the building. Some material, such as brick, was salvaged from the old Meacham Mine building.

== Construction ==
Deerwood's community hall project was built by local funds and relief labor at a cost of $43,000 (equivalent to $963,021 in 2025). In early March 1935, a crew of 25 men began hauling the stone to the site. By mid-month about one-third of the rock had been transported. Most of it was gathered from the Cuyuna Country Club golf grounds. By early April excavation for the basement and trenches for the foundation footings had begun.

On August 2 1935, construction was stopped with only a portion of the walls completed. The work programs of SERA had been cancelled and transferred to the Works Progress Administration (WPA). However, all current SERA projects had to be resubmitted to the WPA for approval before work could resume. In late August, Victor Christgau, the state WPA administrator, announced that the project had been approved, and work continued.

However, in August 1936 it was announced that work on the auditorium would cease because funds had been depleted. It was necessary to wait for a new appropriation. The workers were assigned to other WPA projects, but five stayed on to complete the auditorium's roof. By early September the walls were complete. It was hoped that interior work would be finished by November for the town's annual lutefisk dinner.

Additional funds for the building were approved by the WPA in early October 1936. Work on the building resumed with a full crew. When the lutefisk dinner was held in late October, attendance was estimated at 1,000. The Deerwood Enterprise noted that "The new municipal auditorium thus received its initiation as a community center for Deerwood activities." By February 1, 1937, the village council was meeting in the new building.

== Significance ==
The Deerwood Auditorium is a prime example of a modern municipal facility made possible by the relief programs of the New Deal. It provided local residents with an auditorium and gymnasium space, council chambers, a library, and a fire hall. The building expanded the range of services available to the residents of Deerwood and enhanced their quality of life.

The exterior of the auditorium was renovated in 2010 to preserve its historic appearance. As of the early 21st century it remains the town's most prominent building.

== See also ==
- National Register of Historic Places listings in Crow Wing County, Minnesota
