= Howard E. Smith (Minnesota politician) =

American politician (1917–2011)

1973 portrait of Smith

Howard E. Smith (March 16, 1917 – June 6, 2011) was an American businessman and politician.

Smith was born in Chicago, Illinois and graduated from Aitkin High School in Aitkin, Minnesota. He received his bachelor's degree in economics and political science from University of Minnesota in 1939. He lived near Deerwood, Crow Wing County, Minnesota and was the owner and manager of the Ben Franklin Stores in Crosby, Minnesota and in Aitkin, Minnesota. Smith also lived in Crosby, Minnesota with his wife and family and served on the Crosby Ironton School Board from 1952 to 1964. Smith then served in the Minnesota House of Representatives from 1967 to 1972 and was a Democrat. Smith died in Salem, Oregon and was buried in Aitkin, Minnesota.
