= Portsmouth Mine Pit Lake =

Artificial lake in Minnesota, US

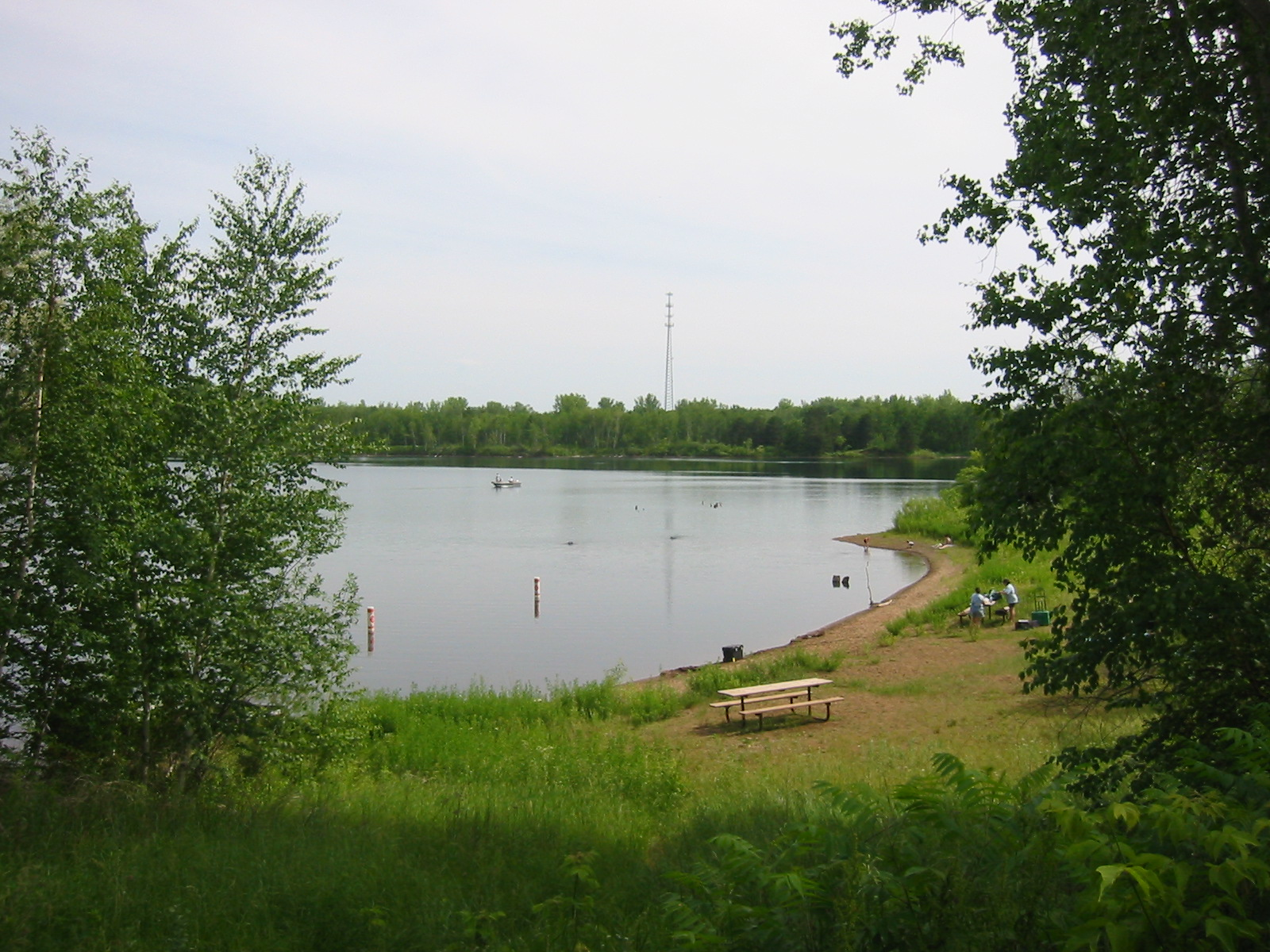
- A view of the swimming area from the campground on the west shore of the lake.

- Location within Minnesota Location within the United States
- Location: Crosby, Minnesota
- Coordinates: 46°29′22″N 93°57′53.5″W
- Type: Artificial lake
- Basin countries: United States
- Surface area: 121 acres (49 ha)
- Max. depth: 450 ft (140 m)

Portsmouth Mine Pit Lake, sometimes called the Portsmouth Pit, is the deepest lake completely within the state of Minnesota, USA. It has a depth of over 450 feet (137 m), according to the most recent Minnesota DNR data. Lake Superior, over 700 feet deep off the north shore of the state, is technically deeper. The 120-acre (49 ha) artificial lake is a former iron mining pit in the Cuyuna Range that has since filled with water.

It is part of the Cuyuna Country State Recreation Area, located in Crow Wing County. The lake is within Crosby city limits.

The Minnesota DNR has repeatedly stocked the lake with brook and rainbow trout.

On August 19, 1957, the mine pit, then not yet filled with water, was launch site for a big stratospheric balloon, the second flight of the Air Force's Project Manhigh.

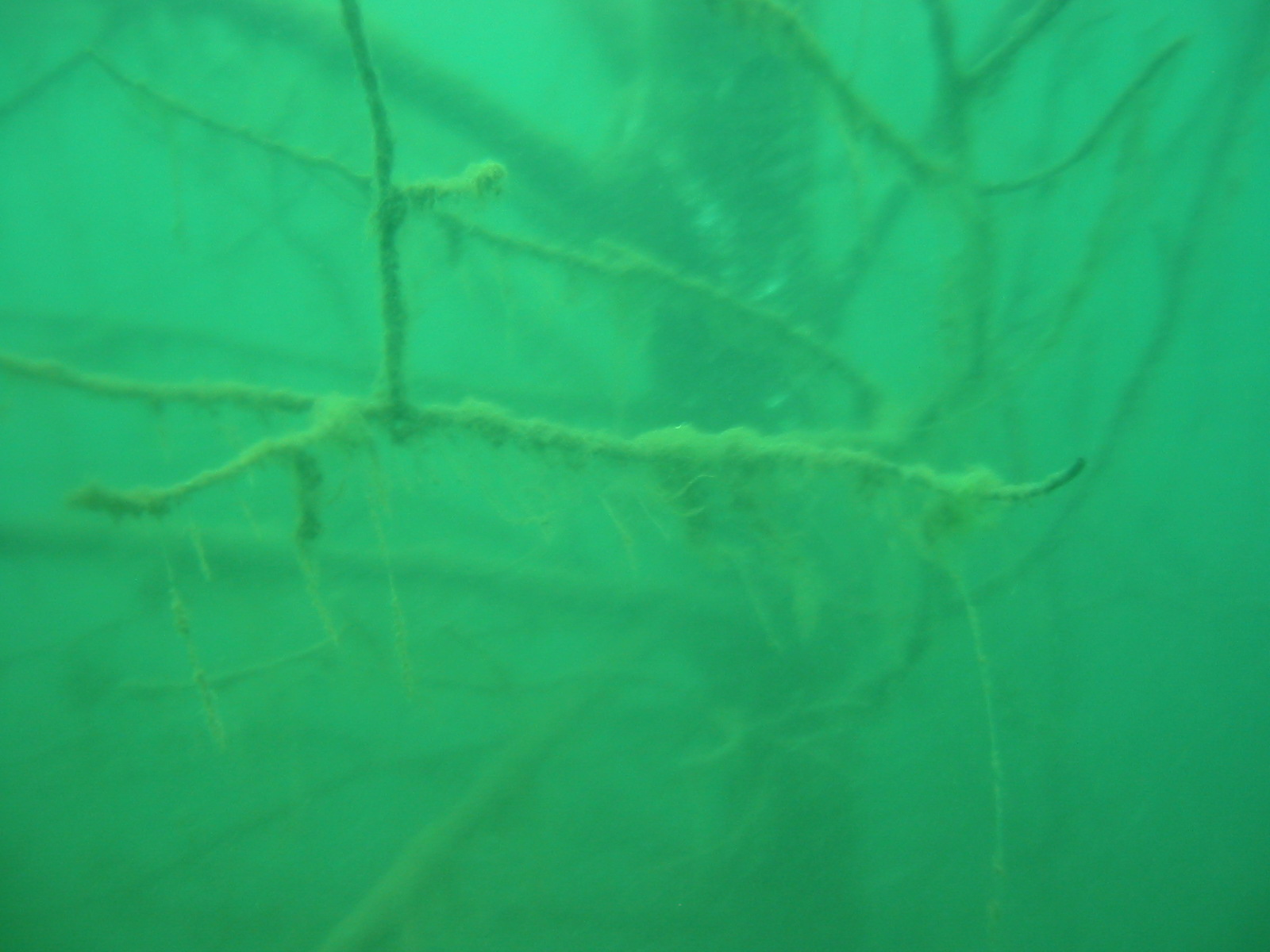
A submerged tree just off the west shore of the lake.
