= Let There Be Light (Smith book) =

Book by Howard Alan Smith

Let There Be Light: Modern Cosmology and Kabbalah, a New Conversation Between Science and Religion
- Author: Howard Smith
- Publisher: New World Library
- Publication date: 2006
- ISBN: 978-1-57731-548-3

Let There Be Light: Modern Cosmology and Kabbalah, a New Conversation Between Science and Religion is a book by Howard Smith, an astrophysicist. The book, published in 2006, was written for the layperson. It discusses using simple language basic concepts in modern cosmology and Kabbalah (a form of Jewish mysticism), the creation of the universe from nothing via the Big Bang, general relativity, dark matter, cosmic acceleration, quantum mechanics, and free will, among other topics. The book attempts to clearly explains these subjects, and uses them to try to illustrate how religion and science together can enrich one's spiritual and intellectual life.

== Bibliography ==
- Howard Smith (2006). Let there be light: modern cosmology and Kabbalah : a new conversation between science and religion. New World Library. ISBN 978-1-57731-548-3.
