= Cuyuna Country State Recreation Area =

Recreation area in Minnesota, United States

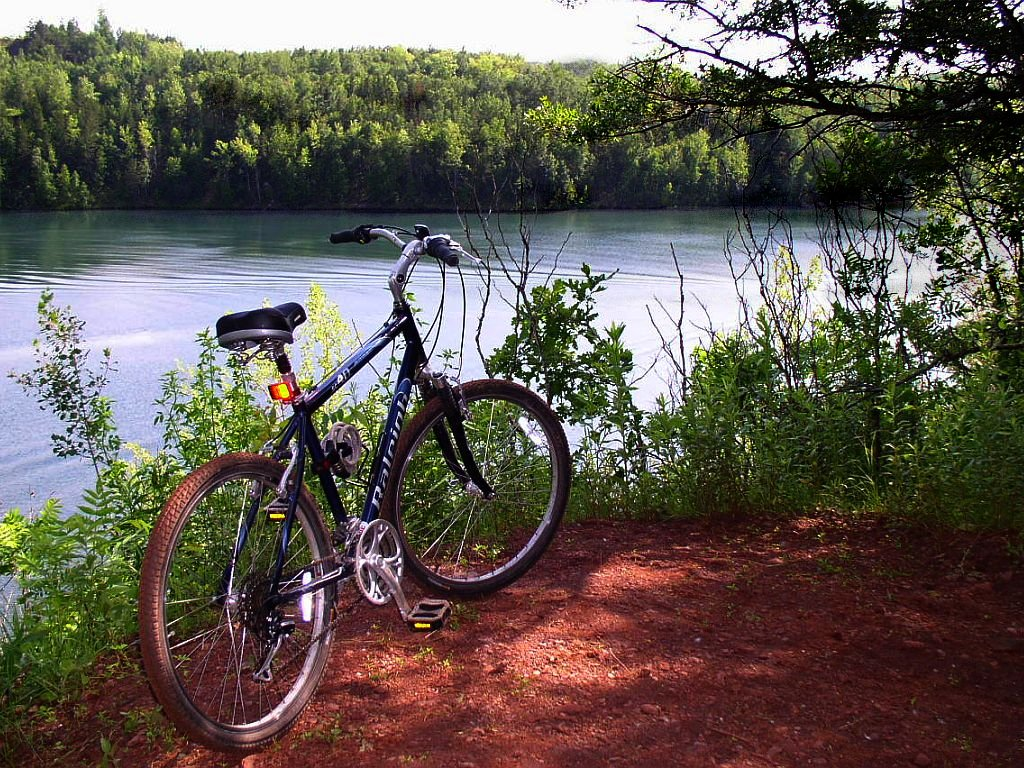
- A mountain biking trail overlooking a pit mine lake

- Location within Minnesota Location within the United States
- Location: Crow Wing, Minnesota, United States
- Coordinates: 46°29′22″N 93°58′39″W
- Area: 2,773 acres (11.22 km^{2})
- Established: 1993
- Governing body: Minnesota Department of Natural Resources

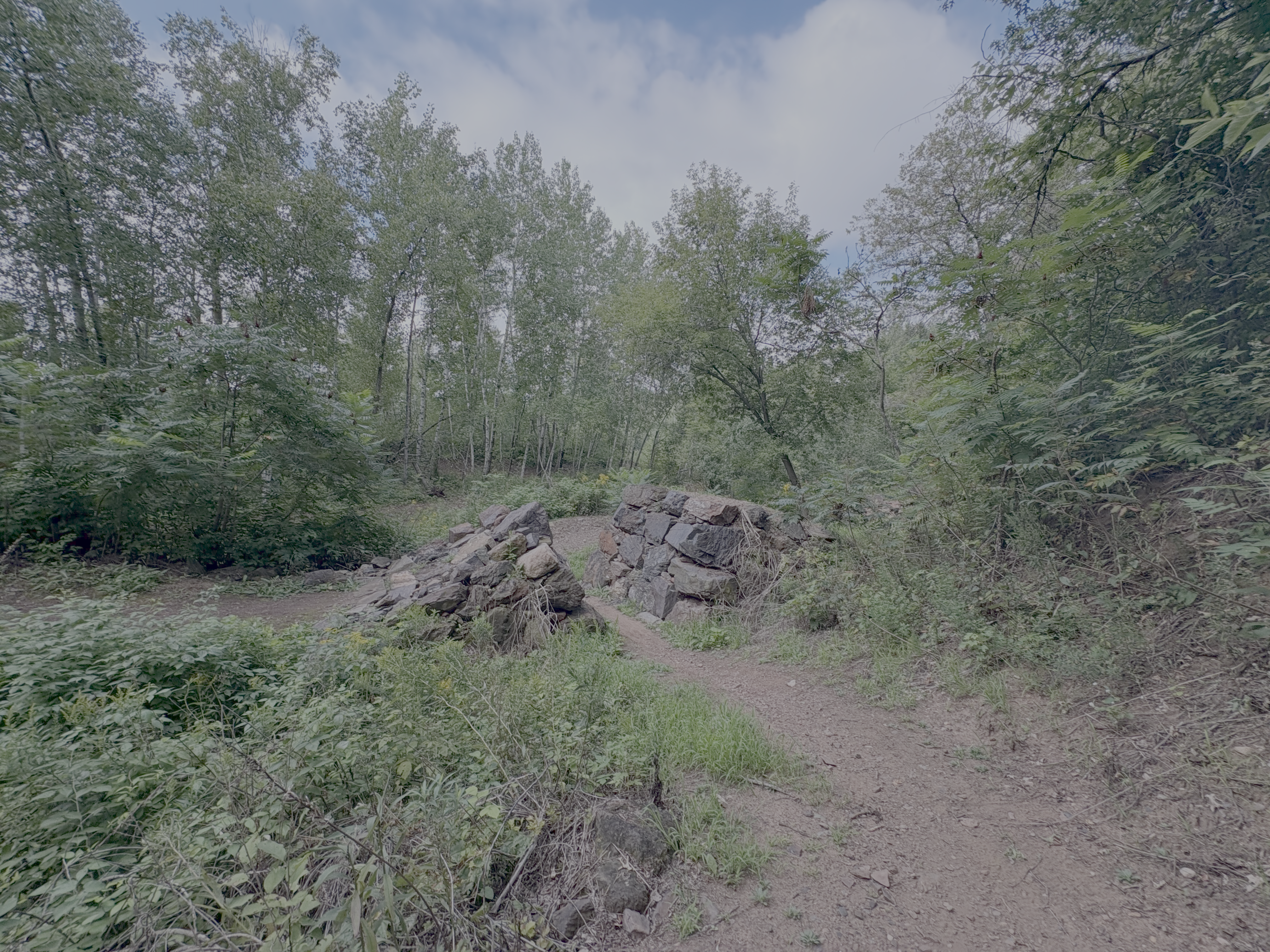

Cuyuna Country State Recreation Area (CCSRA) is a state park unit of Minnesota, USA, being developed to rehabilitate a portion of the Cuyuna Range where mining pits and piles of waste rock were left behind after decades of open-pit mining for iron ore. Abandoned by mining companies more than 20 years ago, the state recreation area consists of regenerated vegetation and clear lakes that draw a wide range of recreation enthusiasts. The park is located off Minnesota State Highway 210, near the towns of Crosby, Ironton and Cuyuna. The Croft Mine Historical Park, formerly city-run, is now part of the state recreation area.

The Cuyuna Lakes State Trail is a paved 6.1-mile (9.8 km) path that stretches through the multi-unit Cuyuna Country State Recreation Area. In June 2011 30 miles (48 km) of single track trails for mountain biking officially opened to the public. The Cuyuna Lakes Mountain Bike Park has been designed for both recreational and experienced mountain bikers. This park is endorsed by the International Mountain Bicycling Association as a Ride Center; saying "With purpose-built trails for beginners, intermediates and experts, riders from across the region are making the pilgrimage to a new Midwest Mecca" As of the summer of 2021, CCSRA has over 70 miles of mountain bike trails covering over 800 acres. Trail difficulty ranges from beginner to expert.

The mine pits have naturally filled with water and one, Portsmouth Mine Pit Lake, is considered the deepest lake in Minnesota.
