= Luxx =

Luxx may refer to

- Luxx, a monthly magazine insert for The Times, originally edited by Kate Reardon
- Luxx Noir London, an American drag performer
- LuxX Index, a stock market index for the Luxembourg Stock Exchange
- Elektra Luxx, a 2010 comedy film, or its central character
- Grand Luxx, a band formed by Brian Marshall
- LUXx video, a pornographic video company in Hungary that featured Katalin Vad
- Luxx Lighting Company, a horticultural lighting company acquired by Scotts Miracle-Gro Company in 2022

== See also ==
- Lux (disambiguation)
