= Karl Emil Nygard =

American politician (1906–1984)

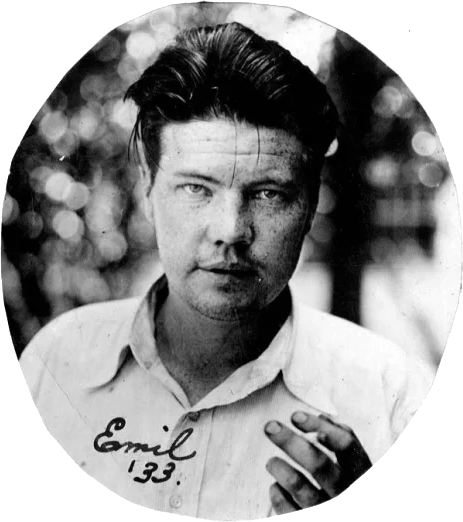
- Nygard in 1933

Mayor of Crosby, Minnesota
- In office January 3, 1933 – January 2, 1934
- Preceded by: F. H. Kraus
- Succeeded by: N. Waldimiross

Personal details
- Born: August 25, 1906 Iron Belt, Wisconsin, U.S.
- Died: April 26, 1984 (aged 77) Detroit Lakes, Minnesota, U.S.
- Party: Communist
- Spouse: Helen Koski (m. 1936)
- Children: 6

Karl Emil Nygard (also known as Emil C. Nygard and by the pen name Ada M. Oredigger; August 25, 1906 – April 26, 1984) was an American politician who became the first Communist mayor in the United States when he was elected president of the village council of Crosby, Minnesota, in 1932.

== Background ==
The son of Swedish-speaking immigrants from Finland, Nygard was born in Iron Belt, Wisconsin, and grew up in Crosby, Minnesota.

== Career ==
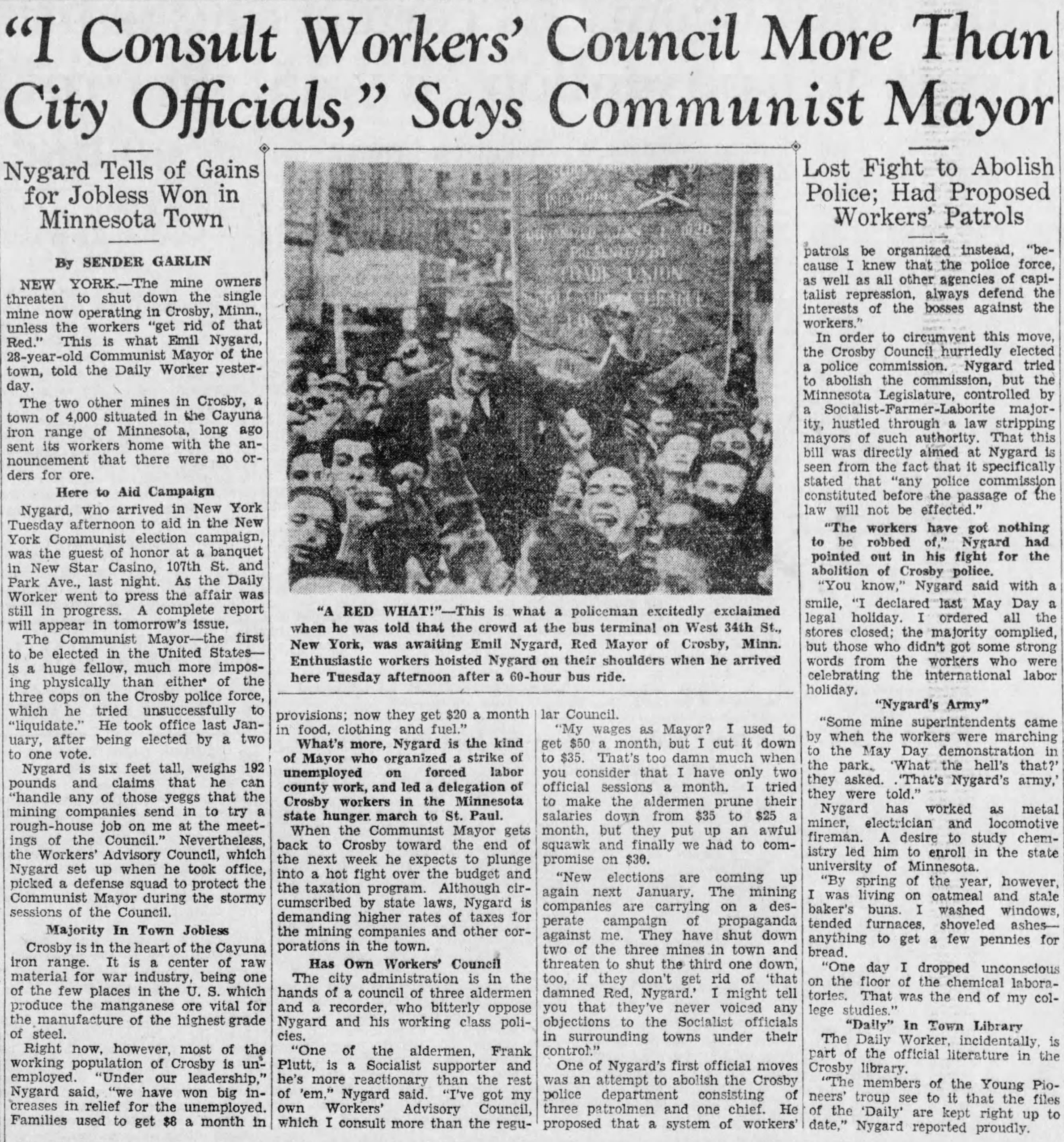
Article on Nygard by Sender Garlin in the Daily Worker on October 19, 1933

Nygard ran for mayor in 1930 and 1931 and lost by 250 and 48 votes, respectively. In the 1932 general election, he ran unsuccessfully for state railroad and warehouse commissioner, polling 9,458 votes statewide. In the December 6, 1932, village election, he won the mayoralty on the Workers Ticket with 529 votes to incumbent F. H. Kraus's 359 and Ernest B. Erickson's 301; he was inaugurated on January 3, 1933.

Saying he was "under the strict discipline of the Communist party", Nygard incorporated the Workers Advisory Committee into the municipal government by allowing it to pass bills before they went before the village council. On a controversial trip to New York City in 1933, he was accused of exaggerating his influence to Communist audiences and boasted of his challenges to the authority of Crosby police and businessmen. One of his acts in office was to declare May Day an official holiday. In the Daily Worker, the CPUSA's official newspaper, Sender Garlin wrote, "The mine owners threaten to shut down the single mine now operating in Crosby, Minn., unless the workers 'get rid of that Red'," following the closing of the only other mines there. N. Waldimiross defeated Nygard in the 1933 mayoral election by 788 votes. Nygard made his last run in 1934.

== Personal life and death ==
Nygard married Helen Koski, a Mennonite, in 1936 and they raised their family in Becker County. Though he distanced himself from the Communist Party, he reportedly remained committed to Marxism for the rest of his life.

Nygard died at his home near Detroit Lakes, Minnesota, on April 26, 1984, at the age of 77.
