= Howard Alan Smith =

Howard Alan Smith is a senior astrophysicist at the Center for Astrophysics | Harvard & Smithsonian, and is the former chair of the astronomy department at Smithsonian Institution’s National Air and Space Museum in Washington, DC.

A research scientist with several hundred scholarly publications, he served as a visiting astronomer at NASA headquarters. He was co-investigator of Kuiper Airborne Observatory (KAO) discovery of a stellar laser at MWC 349.

Active in public education, he has been recognized by Harvard for excellence in teaching. He is a traditional, observant Jew, and has lectured on cosmology and Kabbalah for over twenty years.

He taught a cosmology telecourse for Our Learning Company.

== Works ==
- Let there be light: modern cosmology and Kabbalah : a new conversation between science and religion. New World Library. 2006. ISBN 978-1-57731-548-3.
