= Mary Stuart Lux =

American politician

Member of the Washington House of Representatives from the 22nd district
- In office 1964–1968

Personal details
- Born: August 13, 1920 Utica, New York
- Died: March 18, 2012 (aged 91) Olympia, Washington
- Party: Democratic
- Education: Johns Hopkins University; Cornell University

Mary Ann Stuart Lux (August 13, 1920 – March 18, 2012) was an American politician. She was a Democrat, and represented District 22 in the Washington House of Representatives which included parts of Thurston County, from 1964 to 1968.

She served in the Army as a nurse and graduated from Johns Hopkins University. She moved with her husband James Lux and their growing family to Olympia in 1956. She was a member of Olympia City Council from 1982 to 1995.
