= Rabbit Lake (Parry Sound District) =

Body of water in Ontario, Canada, flowing into Lake Huron

- Location within Ontario
- Location: Parry Sound District, Ontario
- Coordinates: 45°49′34″N 80°06′34″W
- Basin countries: Canada
- Max. length: 1,690 metres (5,540 ft)
- Max. width: 210 metres (690 ft)
- Surface elevation: 233 metres (764 ft)

Rabbit Lake is a small lake in Parry Sound District in Central Ontario, Canada. It is part of the Great Lakes Basin, lies in geographic Wilson Township, and is within Island Lake Forest and Barrens Conservation Reserve. The lake exits at the southwest via an unnamed creek, then flows via the Still River to Byng Inlet on Georgian Bay, Lake Huron.

== See also ==
- List of lakes in Ontario
