= Fiat Lux (disambiguation) =

Fiat Lux (Latin, "Let there be light"), comes from the third verse of the Book of Genesis.

Fiat Lux may also refer to:

- Fiat Lux (band), a 1980s English synthpop band
- "Fiat Lux", a poem by Lynda Hull
- Fiat Lux, a science fiction novella by Walter M. Miller, Jr.
- Fiat Lux (UFO religion), a cult based in Germany
- Fiat Lux (film), a 1923 Austrian film
- Fiat lux, Latin motto of the University of California system

== See also ==
- Let There Be Light (disambiguation)
