= Kazimierz Lux =

- Born: 1780; Warsaw, Poland
- Died: 1846 (aged 65–66); Warsaw, Poland
- Piratical career
- Type: Officer, Pirate
- Allegiance: Duchy of Warsaw, Congress Poland
- Years active: 1795-1805, 1820-1846
- Rank: Captain
- Base of operations: Atlantic

Kazimierz Lux (1780–1846) was an officer of the Polish Legions and a pirate in the Caribbean Sea during the early 19th century.

== Biography ==
Lux was born in Warsaw. Upon reaching the age of 15, he joined the Dąbrowski's Legions in the French Army and fought during the Italian campaign. In 1803 on Consul Napoleon Bonaparte's order, his semibrigade, commanded by general Charles Leclerc, was sent to San Domingo to restore French rule over the island which rebelled in 1801.

After pacifying the rebellion, Lux started a career of piracy - shooting and boarding an American brig was one of his more spectacular successes; the vessel was later sold for 20 000 francs in Havana.

After returning to Europe, Lux served in the army of the Duchy of Warsaw, a French client state created by Napoleon, who was now Emperor of the French. Lux took part in the French invasion of Russia in 1812, and served as an officer in the army of Congress Poland.

Lux died in Warsaw in 1846.
