= Lux Mundi =

Lux Mundi (Latin for "Light of the World") may refer to:

- Lux Mundi (statue), a statue of Jesus by Tom Tsuchiya
- Lux Mundi (book), an 1889 collection of 12 essays by liberal Anglo-Catholic theologians
- Lux Mundi (album), a 2011 album by the heavy metal band Samael
- Wessel Gansfort (1419–1489), humanist of the 15th century who was widely known as Lux Mundi
- Lux Mundi (band), an American drum & bass band and production duo
