= Rabbit Lake (Muskoka District) =

Lake in Ontario, Canada

- Location within Ontario
- Location: Georgian Bay, District Municipality of Muskoka, Ontario
- Coordinates: 44°59′27″N 79°54′43″W
- Basin countries: Canada
- Max. length: 330 metres (1,080 ft)
- Max. width: 110 metres (360 ft)
- Surface elevation: 178 metres (584 ft)

Rabbit Lake is a small lake in the municipality of Georgian Bay, District Municipality of Muskoka in Central Ontario, Canada. It is part of the Great Lakes Basin and lies in geographic Gibson Township. The lake flows at the north via an unnamed creek to Bushby Inlet on Georgian Bay, Lake Huron.

== See also ==
- List of lakes in Ontario
