= Crosby, Minnesota =

City in Minnesota, United States

Crosby
- City
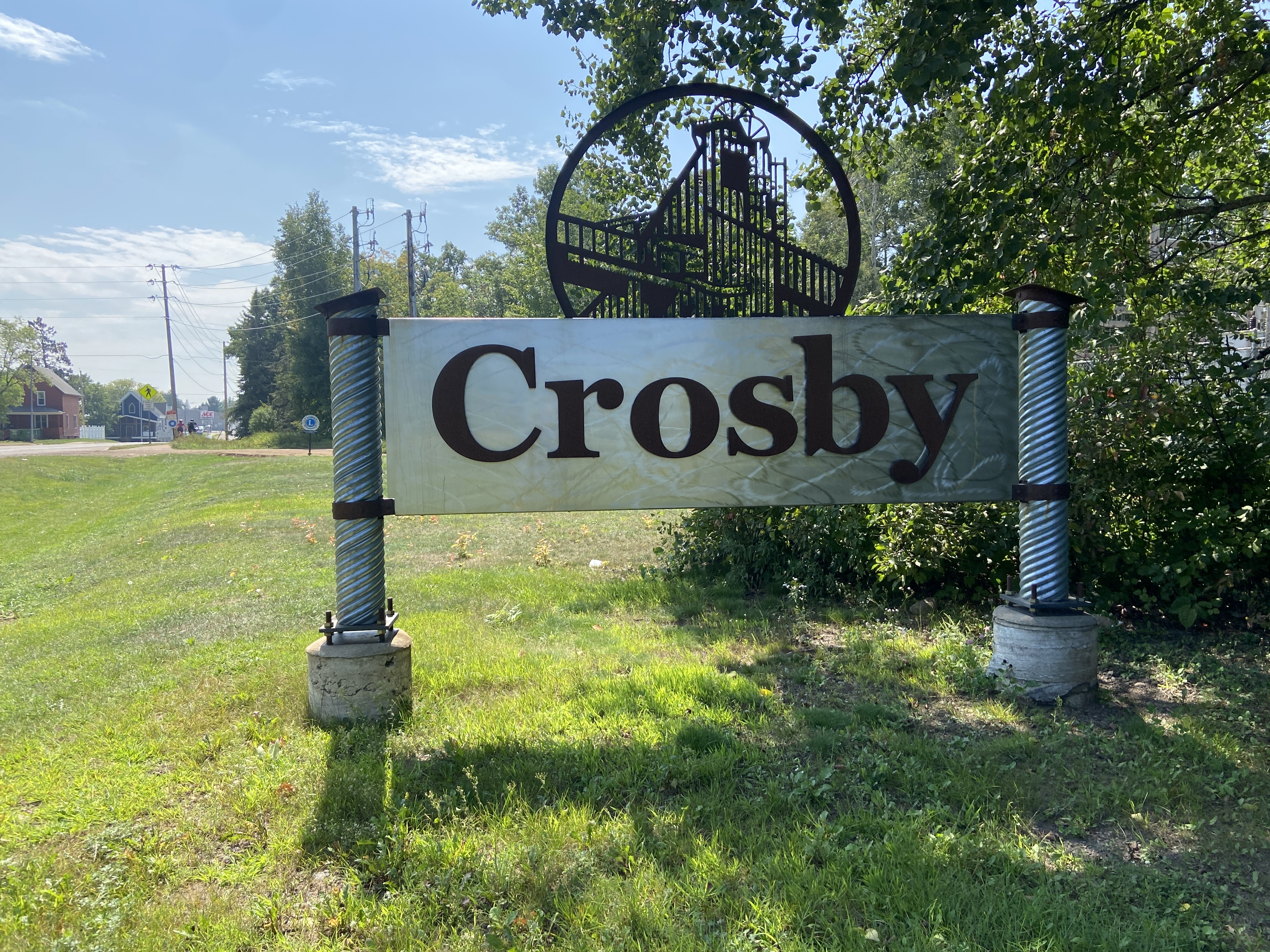
- Welcome Sign in Crosby
- Motto: Founded by George H. Crosby
- Location of Crosby within Crow Wing County, Minnesota
- Coordinates: 46°29′31″N 93°57′29″W
- Country: United States
- State: Minnesota
- County: Crow Wing

Area
  - Total: 3.73 sq mi (9.66 km^{2})
  - Land: 2.95 sq mi (7.65 km^{2})
  - Water: 0.78 sq mi (2.01 km^{2})
- Elevation: 1,230 ft (370 m)

Population (2020)
  - Total: 2,360
  - Density: 798.5/sq mi (308.31/km^{2})
- Time zone: UTC-6 (Central (CST))
  - Summer (DST): UTC-5 (CDT)
- ZIP code: 56441
- Area code: 218
- FIPS code: 27-13924
- GNIS feature ID: 2393679
- Website: https://www.cityofcrosby.com/

Crosby is a city in Crow Wing County, Minnesota, United States. The population was 2,360 at the 2020 census. It is part of the Brainerd Micropolitan Statistical Area. Crosby is adjacent to its twin city of Ironton, in the Cuyuna Iron Range.

== History ==
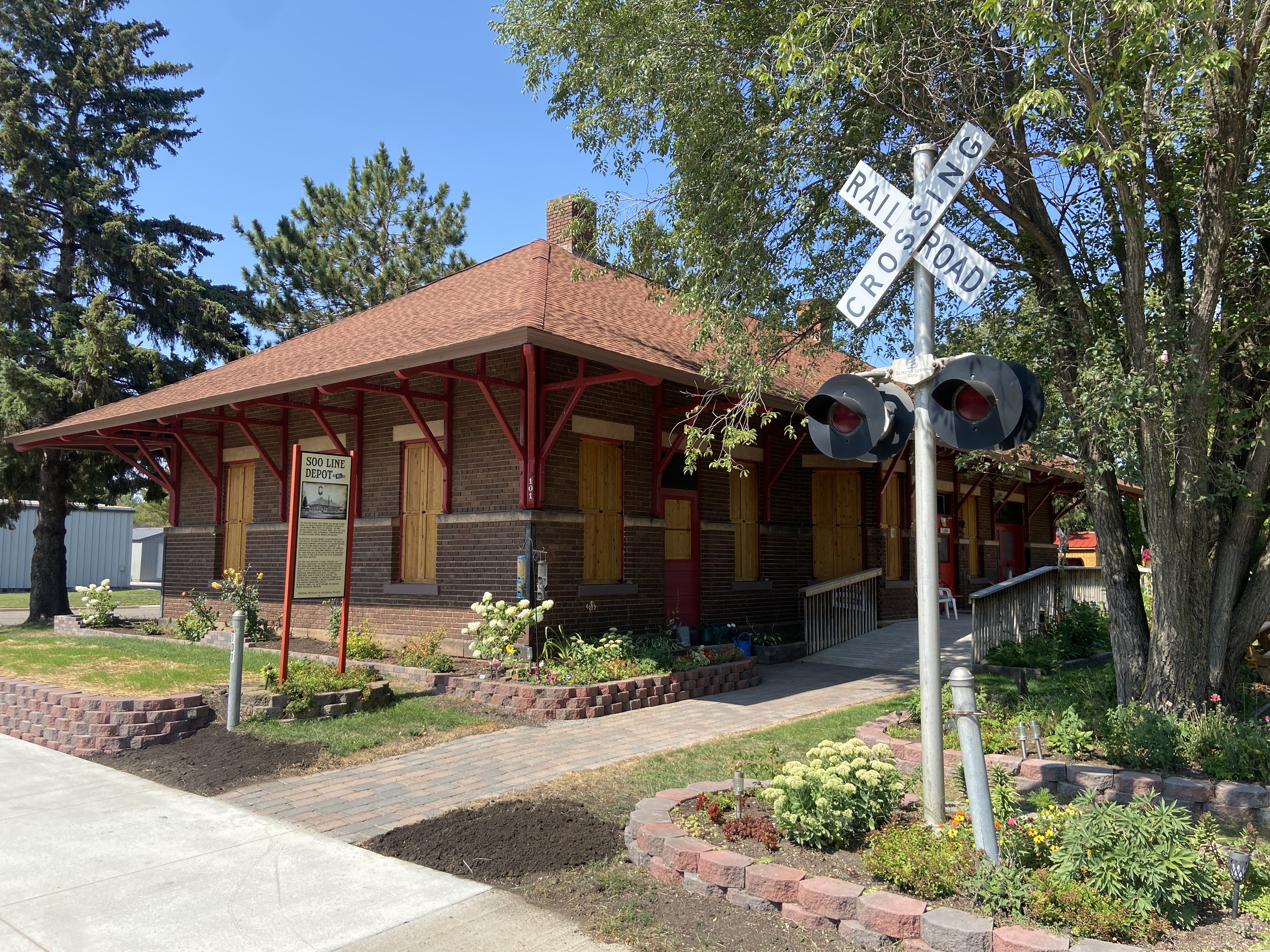
Cuyuna Range Museum

Crosby was built for the sole purpose of mining. It was named for George H. Crosby, a businessman in the mining industry.

Crosby was the location of Minnesota's worst mining disaster, the Milford Mine disaster. On February 5, 1924, a new tunnel was blasted too close to nearby Foley Lake, and water rushed in, killing 41 miners.

In the 1932 local elections, Karl Emil Nygard was elected president of Crosby's Village Council, making it the first city in the United States to have a Communist mayor. 27-year-old Nygard won by a vote of 529 - 359, with goals to raise money for families on welfare, declare a moratorium on government debts to local banks, and guarantee water and electricity services to all citizens.

Once Nygard was elected in 1933, he and village workers rallied for the First National Bank of Crosby to release $23,000 in village funds which it was withholding, which it did, allowing the government to feed unemployed citizens. In January 1933, Nygard also organized an "Unemployed Council," who subsequently demanded relief stipends, free city water and lights, freedom to purchase food from any store, and the abolition of the "Relief Administration" where citizens had to ask the council for financial assistance. The council agreed to all demands except the last. Nygard's and council members' salaries were reduced, as were those of the Crosby police force.

Also in early 1933, Crosby drew regional attention for its policies, with multiple newspapers reprinting the headline and story “Crosby Citizens! How Do You Like This?” detailing Nygard’s radicalism. Unemployed workers went on strike in May, refusing to provide "free labor" for local Federal Emergency Relief Administration projects. However, by November, the Civil Works Administration had co-opted the communist campaign promise of cash payment for relief projects, leading many workers to join the Civilian Conservation Corps and abandon the party. During 1933 mayoral election, Crosby citizens united to campaign for Nicolai Wladimiroff, a Finnish storeowner, who defeated Nygard in his fourth run for office by 735 - 277.

In August 1957, David G. Simons, a 35-year-old Air Force major, climbed to nearly 102,000 feet (31,000 m) above the earth as part of Project Manhigh. The flight, which was launched from Crosby's 400-foot-deep (120 m) Portsmouth Mine Pit Lake, helped the United States take its fledgling steps into space exploration. Simons returned to Crosby in 2007 to mark the 50th anniversary of the project.

== Geography ==
Crosby is in eastern Crow Wing County at the intersection of Minnesota Highways 6 and 210. Ironton is adjacent to the west and Deerwood lies to the east along route 210. Serpent Lake is adjacent to the southeast and the Cuyuna Country State Recreation Area is to the northwest. The Mississippi River flows by four miles to the north.

According to the United States Census Bureau, the city has an area of 3.73 square miles (9.66 km^{2}), of which 3.07 square miles (7.95 km^{2}) is land and 0.66 square miles (1.71 km^{2}) is water.

== Demographics ==
Historical population
Census	Pop.	Note	%±
1920	3,500		—
1930	3,451		−1.4%
1940	2,954		−14.4%
1950	2,777		−6.0%
1960	2,629		−5.3%
1970	2,241		−14.8%
1980	2,218		−1.0%
1990	2,073		−6.5%
2000	2,299		10.9%
2010	2,386		3.8%
2020	2,360		−1.1%
U.S. Decennial Census

=== 2020 census ===
As of the 2020 census, Crosby had a population of 2,360. The median age was 44.9 years. 20.6% of residents were under the age of 18 and 26.9% of residents were 65 years of age or older. For every 100 females there were 97.7 males, and for every 100 females age 18 and over there were 93.1 males age 18 and over.

0.0% of residents lived in urban areas, while 100.0% lived in rural areas.

There were 1,057 households in Crosby, of which 21.9% had children under the age of 18 living in them. Of all households, 30.7% were married-couple households, 27.4% were households with a male householder and no spouse or partner present, and 31.6% were households with a female householder and no spouse or partner present. About 42.9% of all households were made up of individuals and 19.5% had someone living alone who was 65 years of age or older.

There were 1,217 housing units, of which 13.1% were vacant. The homeowner vacancy rate was 1.9% and the rental vacancy rate was 6.4%.

Racial composition as of the 2020 census
Race	Number	Percent
White	2,219	94.0%
Black or African American	8	0.3%
American Indian and Alaska Native	30	1.3%
Asian	9	0.4%
Native Hawaiian and Other Pacific Islander	1	0.0%
Some other race	6	0.3%
Two or more races	87	3.7%
Hispanic or Latino (of any race)	28	1.2%

=== 2010 census ===
As of the census of 2010, there were 2,386 people, 1,065 households, and 552 families living in the city. The population density was 777.2 inhabitants per square mile (300.1/km^{2}). There were 1,241 housing units at an average density of 404.2 per square mile (156.1/km^{2}). The racial makeup of the city was 96.3% White, 0.4% African American, 1.1% Native American, 0.6% Asian, 0.1% from other races, and 1.5% from two or more races. Hispanic or Latino of any race were 1.3% of the population.

There were 1,065 households, of which 27.5% had children under the age of 18 living with them, 32.3% were married couples living together, 13.8% had a female householder with no husband present, 5.7% had a male householder with no wife present, and 48.2% were non-families. 42.3% of all households were made up of individuals, and 22.8% had someone living alone who was 65 years of age or older. The average household size was 2.13 and the average family size was 2.88.

The median age in the city was 43.2 years. 23.3% of residents were under the age of 18; 7.7% were between the ages of 18 and 24; 20.5% were from 25 to 44; 24.3% were from 45 to 64, and 24.2% were 65 years of age or older. The gender makeup of the city was 46.7% male and 53.3% female.

=== 2000 census ===
As of the census of 2000, there were 2,299 people, 989 households, and 554 families living in the city. The population density was 755.0 inhabitants per square mile (291.5/km^{2}). There were 1,081 housing units at an average density of 355.0 per square mile (137.1/km^{2}). The racial makeup of the city was 97.69% White, 0.04% African American, 0.91% Native American, 0.22% Asian, 0.09% Pacific Islander, 0.35% from other races, and 0.70% from two or more races. Hispanic or Latino of any race were 1.00% of the population. 23.9% were of German, 14.1% Norwegian, 11.7% Swedish, 9.6% American and 7.0% English ancestry according to Census 2000.

There were 989 households, out of which 27.6% had children under the age of 18 living with them, 40.3% were married couples living together, 11.8% had a female householder with no husband present, and 43.9% were non-families. 39.4% of all households were made up of individuals, and 21.2% had someone living alone who was 65 years of age or older. The average household size was 2.18 and the average family size was 2.93.

In the city, the population was spread out, with 24.4% under the age of 18, 8.1% from 18 to 24, 21.9% from 25 to 44, 20.0% from 45 to 64, and 25.6% who were 65 years of age or older. The median age was 42 years. For every 100 females, there were 85.3 males. For every 100 females age 18 and over, there were 79.5 males.

The median income for a household in the city was $24,053, and the median income for a family was $31,629. Males had a median income of $28,879 versus $20,842 for females. The per capita income for the city was $15,465. About 15.6% of families and 16.9% of the population were below the poverty line, including 17.8% of those under age 18 and 12.9% of those age 65 or over.

== Notable people ==
- Nick Anderson, pitcher for the Atlanta Braves
- Anthony "The Bullet" Bonsante, boxer
- Robert A. Good, physician
- Rick Nolan, politician
- Karl Emil Nygard, first Communist mayor in the United States
- Thomas W. Simons Jr., U.S. Ambassador to Poland and Pakistan
- Howard E. Smith, businessman and Minnesota state legislator
