= Rabbit Lake (Algoma District) =

Lake in Ontario, Canada

- Location within Ontario
- Location: Algoma District, Ontario
- Coordinates: 47°24′38″N 84°10′53″W
- Basin countries: Canada
- Max. length: 1,280 metres (4,200 ft)
- Max. width: 710 metres (2,330 ft)
- Surface elevation: 450 metres (1,480 ft)

Rabbit Lake is a small lake in Algoma District in Northeastern Ontario, Canada. It is part of the Great Lakes Basin and lies in geographic Hadley Township. The lake is the source of Rabbit Creek, which exits the lake at the northeast and which flows via the Montreal River to Lake Superior.

== See also ==
- List of lakes in Ontario
