= Howard Smith (footballer) =

Australian rules footballer (1878–1909)

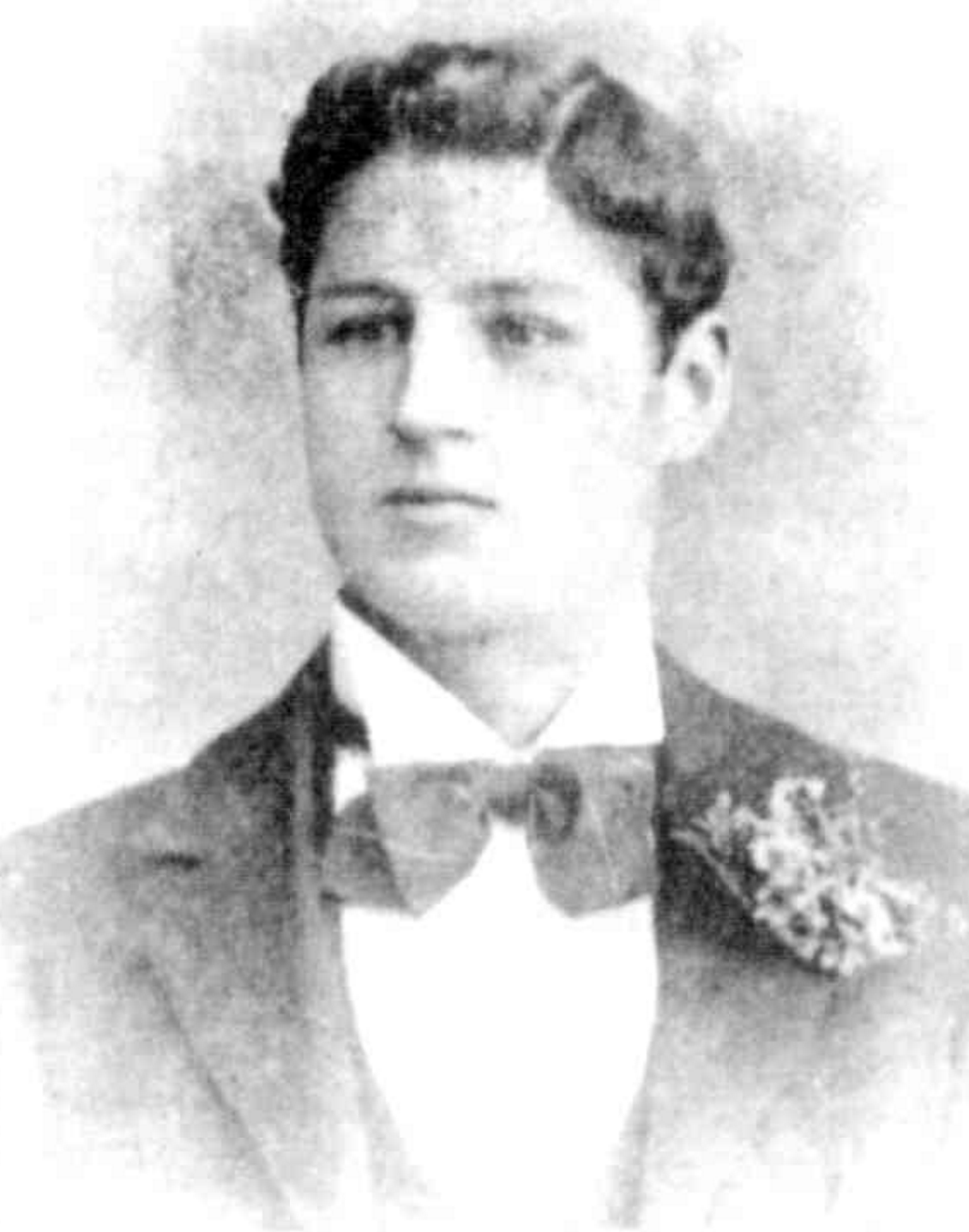
- Smith in 1899

Personal information
- Full name: Howard Percy Melbourne Smith
- Born: 7 March 1878; Prahran, Victoria
- Died: 10 August 1909 (aged 31); Prahran, Victoria
- Original team: Windsor
- Position: Wing

Playing career^{1}
Years	Club	Games (Goals)
1898–1904	St Kilda	95 (6)
- ^{1} Playing statistics correct to the end of 1904.

Howard Percy Melbourne Smith (7 March 1878 – 10 August 1909) was an Australian rules footballer who played with St Kilda in the Victorian Football League (VFL).
