= Rabbit Lake (Number One Creek) =

Lake in Ontario, Canada

- Location within Ontario
- Location: West Nipissing, Nipissing District, Ontario
- Coordinates: 46°11′23″N 80°09′26″W
- Basin countries: Canada
- Max. length: 1,370 metres (4,490 ft)
- Max. width: 250 metres (820 ft)
- Surface elevation: 208 metres (682 ft)

Rabbit Lake is a small lake in the municipality of West Nipissing, Nipissing District in Northeastern Ontario, Canada. It is part of the Great Lakes Basin and lies in geographic Latchford Township. The lake flows via an unnamed creek through Number Two Lake to Number One Lake, which empties via Number One Creek to the West Bay of Lake Nipissing, and then via the French River to Lake Huron.

== See also ==
- List of lakes in Ontario
