= Rabbit Lake (Aylen River) =

Lake in Ontario, Canada

- Location within Ontario
- Location: South Algonquin, Nipissing District, Ontario
- Coordinates: 45°34′59″N 77°50′42″W
- Basin countries: Canada
- Max. length: 370 metres (1,210 ft)
- Max. width: 260 metres (850 ft)
- Surface elevation: 358 metres (1,175 ft)

Rabbit Lake is a small lake in the municipality of South Algonquin in Nipissing District, Ontario, Canada. It is part of the Saint Lawrence River drainage basin and lies in geographic Dickens Township. The lake empties via an unnamed creek to Aylen Lake, which flows via the Aylen River, Opeongo River, Madawaska River and Ottawa River to the Saint Lawrence River.

== See also ==
- List of lakes in Ontario
