= Rabbit Lake (Sudbury District) =

Lake in Ontario, Canada

- Location within Ontario
- Location: Markstay-Warren, Sudbury District, Ontario
- Coordinates: 46°28′54.5″N 80°34′13″W
- Basin countries: Canada
- Max. length: 850 metres (2,790 ft)
- Max. width: 210 metres (690 ft)
- Surface elevation: 220 metres (720 ft)

Rabbit Lake is a small lake in the municipality of Markstay-Warren, Sudbury District in Northeastern Ontario, Canada. It is part of the Great Lakes Basin, is in geographic Awrey Township, and is located 1.5 kilometres (0.93 mi) southwest of Ontario Highway 17 near the community of Markstay. The lake exits at the northeast via an unnamed creek, then flows via the Veuve River, Lake Nipissing and the French River to Georgian Bay on Lake Huron.
