= Rabbit Lake (Minnesota) =

Lake in the state of Minnesota, United States

- Location within Minnesota Location within the United States
- Location: Crow Wing County, Minnesota
- Coordinates: 46°31′49″N 93°55′27″W
- Type: Lake
- Basin countries: United States
- Surface elevation: 1,191 ft (363 m)

Rabbit Lake is a lake in eastern Crow Wing County, in the U.S. state of Minnesota. The community of Cuyuna borders the southern edge of the lake. Crow Wing County Road 31 crosses at a narrow point in the middle of the lake. The Mississippi River flows past just to the north of the lake.

Rabbit Lake is an English translation of the Ojibwe language name.

In the 1930s-1960s, efforts to mine iron from underneath Rabbit Lake led to landmark legal cases to define whether land under lakes is owned by the state or can be owned by private parties who have Riparian water rights along the lakeshore. Rabbit Lake is an eyeglass-shaped lake with an isthmus in the middle called the Narrows, dividing the lake approximately in half. According to state law at the time, because the lake connected downstream to the Mississippi River, the lake was considered navigable. Therefore, the state controlled the rights to the lake and the land underneath.

In 1937, Youngstown Mines Corporation leased the land underneath the east half of Rabbit Lake from the state with the intent to mine iron that had been discovered while drilling samples through the ice in the winter. The company proposed separating the lake by building a causeway at the Narrows, then pumping out the eastern half to mine underneath the bed. They purchased drainage rights from the landowners on the eastern side. The advent of World War II prompted a greater need for iron for the war effort.

Landowners on the western half sued the company for infringing on their riparian rights to the whole lake; the company argued that the body of water was effectively two separate lakes and the mining would not infringe on their rights. The landowners eventually settled for an undisclosed amount and the effort to seal off the eastern and mine underneath it commenced. Later lawsuits emerged where other property owners claimed that the lake was not navigable by legal definition and therefore the land under the lake did not belong to the state but was equally divided among the landowners along the shore, a decision later affirmed by the Minnesota Supreme Court. This led to a later case in 1963 when Youngstown Mines successfully sued for the return of the millions of dollars of royalties sent to the state for the lease over 19 years of mining.

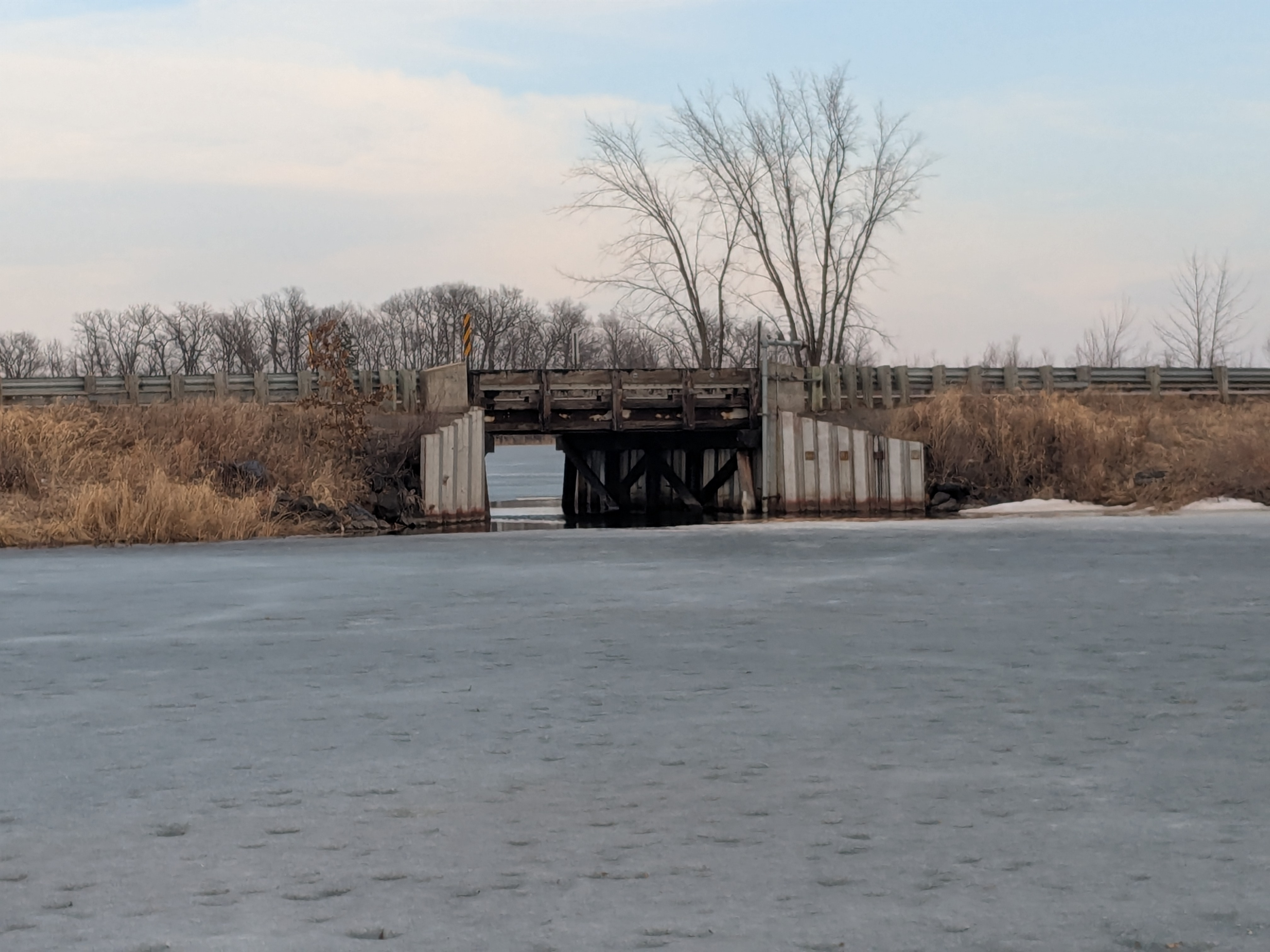
Bridge on the causeway at The Narrows separating the eastern and western halves of Rabbit Lake.

Mining ended in 1973 after more than 4.6 million tons of ore had been removed. The causeway was reopened and a bridge built to carry Crow Wing County Road 31. This bridge was a condition of the original lease arrangement. The eastern half of the lake was allowed to refill. The depth of the eastern half of the lake increased from 40 feet to 337 feet.

On June 12, 2024, a severe thunderstorm with hail and an apparent tornado passed through Rabbit Lake causing property damage, overturning boats and docks, and uprooting trees, but no injuries were reported.

== See also ==
- List of lakes in Minnesota
