= MWC 349 =

Multiple star system in the constellation of Cygnus

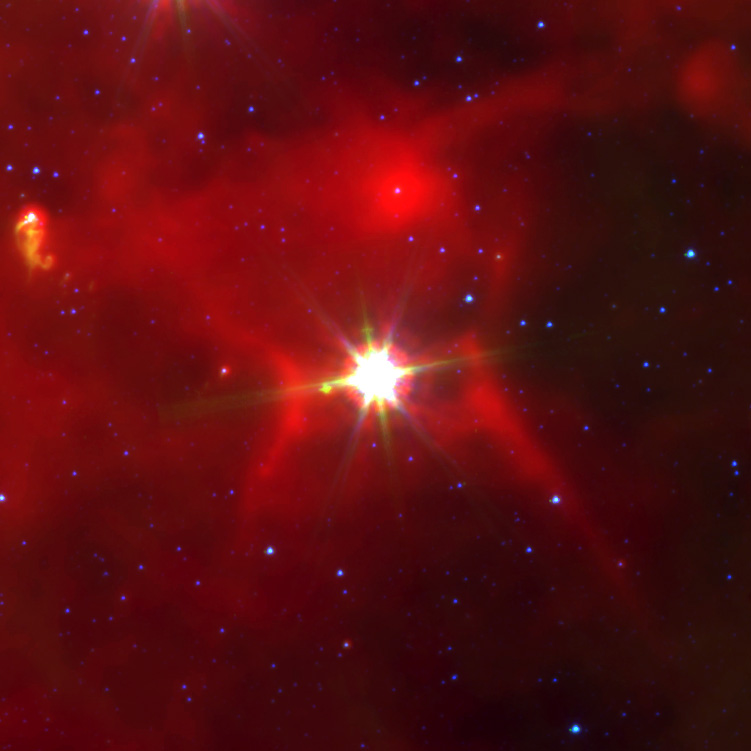
- MWC 349 and its nebula with the Spitzer Space Telescope

Observation data Epoch J2000.0 Equinox ICRS
- Constellation: Cygnus
- Right ascension: 20^{h} 32^{m} 45.493^{s}
- Declination: +40° 39′ 36.75″
- Apparent magnitude (V): 13.15

Characteristics
- Spectral type: Bpe; B0-1.5 I + B0 III

Astrometry
Radial velocity (R_{v})	−9 ± 2 km/s
Proper motion (μ)	RA: 30.2 mas/yr Dec.: −14.4 mas/yr
Distance	4,560 ly (1400 pc)
Absolute magnitude (M_{V})	−6.7 / −7.3

Details

A
Mass	38 M_{☉}
Radius	45 (Note: Calculated, using the Stefan-Boltzmann law and the star's effective temperature and luminosity, with respect to the solar nominal effective temperature of 5,772 K: $$\sqrt{\biggl(\frac{5,772}{25,000}\biggr)^4 \cdot 10^{5.85}} = 45\ R_\odot.$$) R_{☉}
Luminosity (bolometric)	707,000 L_{☉}
Temperature	25,000 K

Other designations
- MWC 349, V1478 Cyg, IRAS 20310+4029, 2MASS J20324553+4039366

Database references
SIMBAD	data

MWC 349 is a double (likely, triple) star system in the constellation Cygnus. Its properties are still debated and it may be a massive highly luminous star or a very young less luminous Herbig Ae/Be star. MWC 349 is also a variable star with the designation V1478 Cygni.

== MWC 349A and B and a third star ==
MWC 349 is a resolved double star, with its components separated by 2.4 arc seconds. The primary, MWC 349A, is a B[e] star, where the B is the spectral type and the [e] denotes forbidden emission lines. Its spectrum lacks absorption features and is variable but has been classified as B0-1.5 with a supergiant luminosity class. The secondary, MWC 349B, is a giant star with a spectral type of B0III.

It has been proposed that there is a third star, of lower mass and closely orbiting MWC 349A, possibly at a distance of 12–13 AU from the primary with a period of 9 years. Such a star has not been observed but would help to explain some unusual properties of the system.

== Features ==
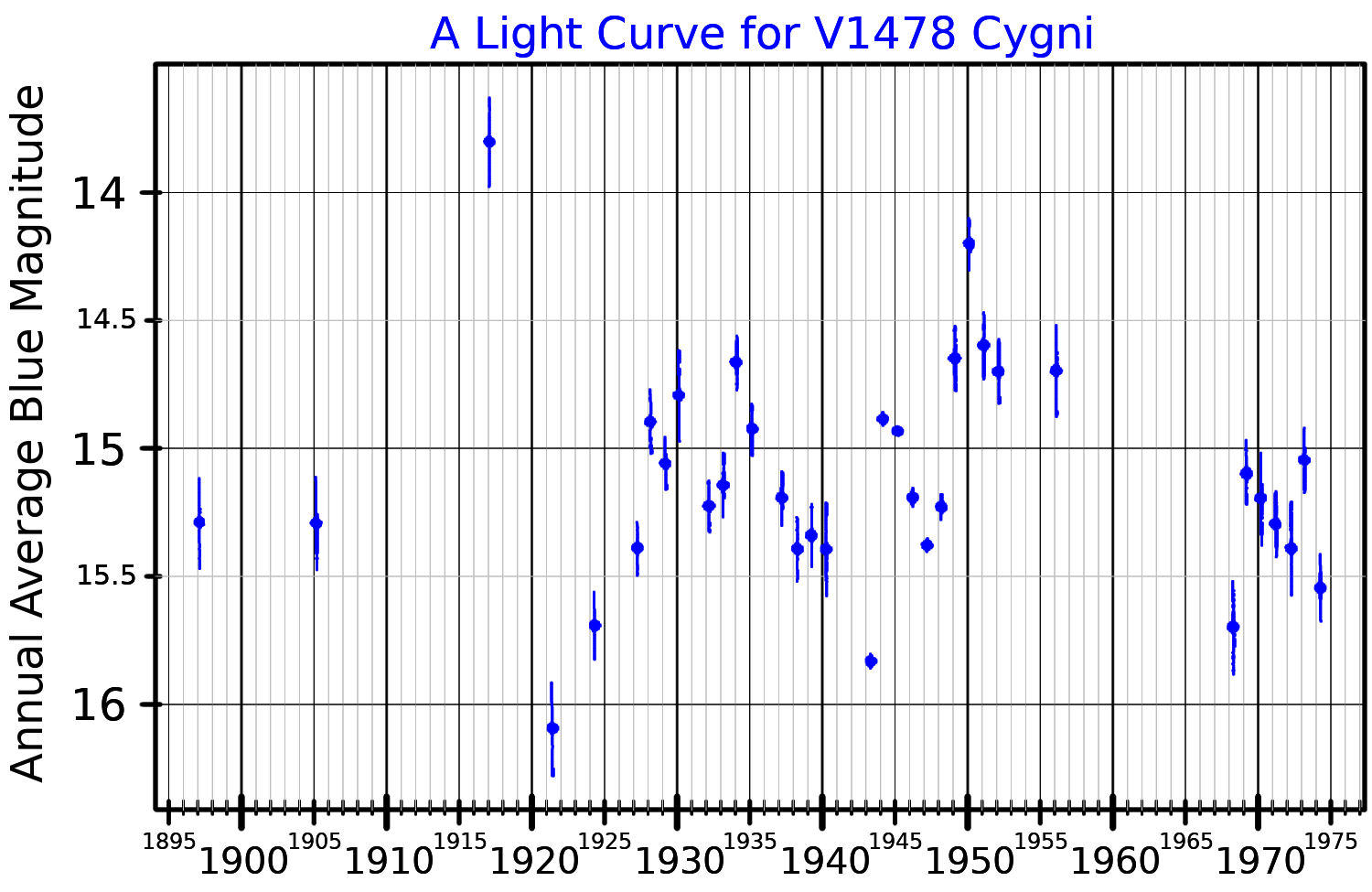
A blue band light curve for V1478 Cygni, adapted from Gottlieb and Liller (1978)

MWC 349B appears to be a relatively conventional hot giant star, but it is nonetheless very unusual. It is a supergiant B[e] star, indicating that it is a luminous star with high mass loss and a disc of surrounding material. These features are shared by pre-main-sequence stars and evolved very massive stars, and it is unclear which category MWC 349A falls into.

MWC 349 is one of the brightest radio sources in the sky and 2 cm observations show a prominent hourglass nebula. It also has a very faint infrared nebula with the same orientation and geometry, but 400 times larger (5 parsecs across). It is extremely unusual in showing hydrogen recombination masers and lasers, interpreted as originating in the disc.

One theory is that MWC 349A is a highly luminous evolved star similar to a luminous blue variable (LBV), with an absolute magnitude somewhere between −6.7 and −7.3, and a bolometric luminosity several hundred thousand times that of the sun. It is a variable star and the General Catalogue of Variable Stars lists it as an S Doradus variable due to its erratic brightness and spectral changes. The distant association with MWC 349B and its remoteness from the dense star-forming regions that would normally host such luminous stars is unusual. One possibility is that the whole system was ejected from Cygnus OB2 and the two components have since become unbound due to mass loss from MWC 349A.

The alternative theory is that MWC 349A is still condensing onto the main sequence. It is still a massive star surrounded by a disc of material but that material was not ejected from the star, and the luminosity is lower than would be the case for a more massive evolved star. The compact nature of the material absorbing and re-radiating much of the stars output suggests that it is unlikely to be extremely luminous.

== Origin ==
MWC 349 may be a runaway star ejected from the nearby, massive Cygnus OB2 association. The mass of the main component of the system, MWC 349A, is assumed to have been when the star was born 40 times the mass of the Sun, but stellar evolution left it with just 20-25 solar masses, destabilizing the system and causing MWC 349B to no longer be gravitationally bound.
