= Deerwood, Minnesota =

City in Minnesota, United States

Deerwood
- City
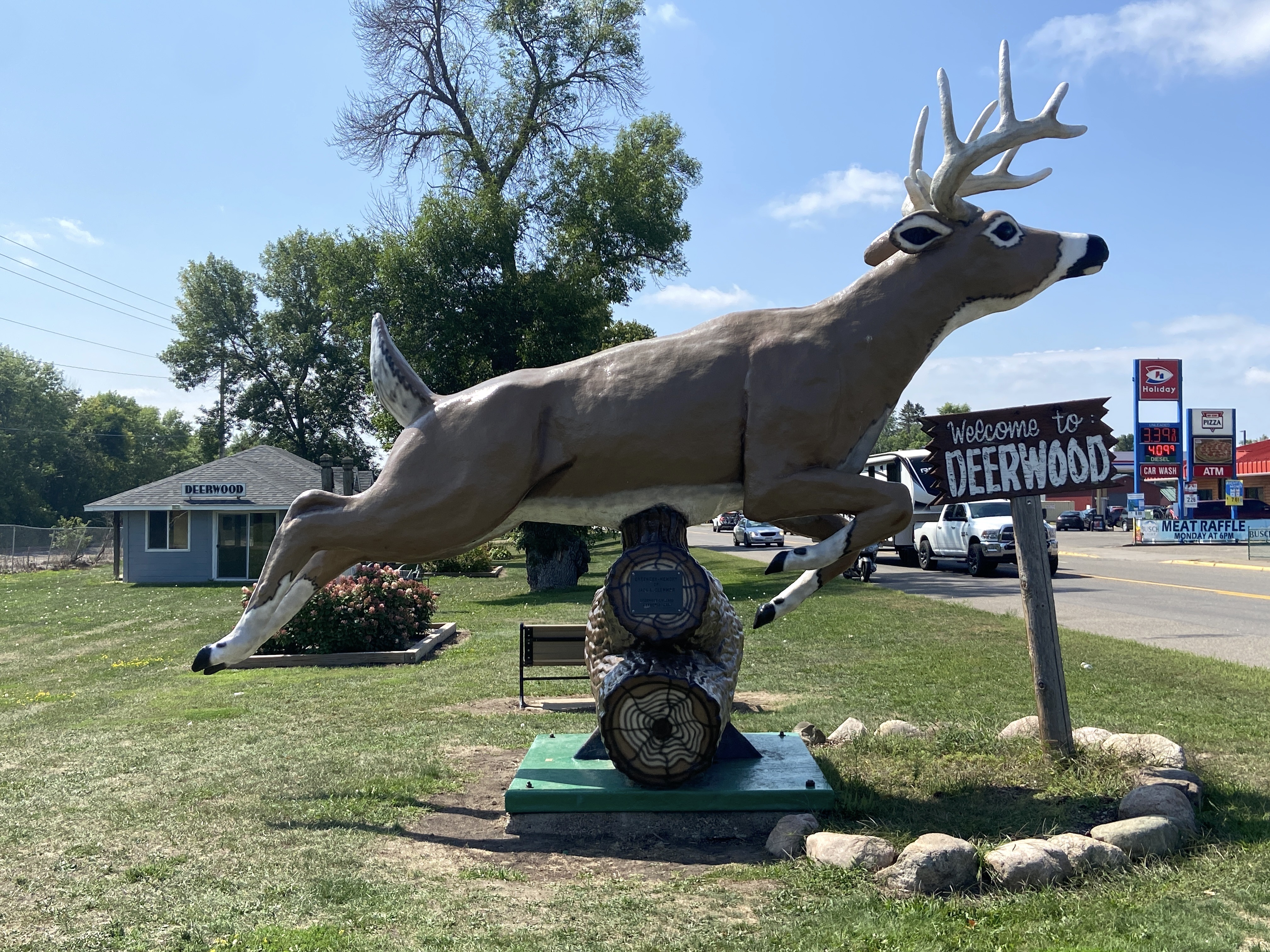
- A deer statue welcomes visitors in Deerwood, Minnesota

- Location of Deerwood within Crow Wing County, Minnesota
- Coordinates: 46°28′23″N 93°54′00″W
- Country: United States
- State: Minnesota
- County: Crow Wing

Area
  - Total: 2.08 sq mi (5.39 km^{2})
  - Land: 1.49 sq mi (3.86 km^{2})
  - Water: 0.59 sq mi (1.53 km^{2})
- Elevation: 1,273 ft (388 m)

Population (2020)
  - Total: 526
  - Density: 353.2/sq mi (136.39/km^{2})
- Time zone: UTC-6 (CST)
  - Summer (DST): UTC-5 (CDT)
- ZIP code: 56444
- Area code: 218
- FIPS code: 27-15346
- GNIS feature ID: 2394491
- Website: cityofdeerwood.gov

Deerwood is a city in Crow Wing County, Minnesota, United States. The population was 526 at the 2020 census. It is part of the Brainerd Micropolitan Statistical Area.

== History ==
Deerwood was platted in February 1892. Deerwood was incorporated in October 1909. The city was named for the abundant deer in the nearby woods. The post office at Deerwood was established in 1882.

== Geography ==
According to the United States Census Bureau, the city has a total area of 2.05 square miles (5.31 km^{2}), of which 1.49 square miles (3.86 km^{2}) is land and 0.56 square miles (1.45 km^{2}) is water. The city of Deerwood is located within Deerwood Township geographically but is a separate entity. Nearby towns include Crosby and Ironton.

Deerwood is located along Minnesota State Highways 6 and 210. Other routes include County Roads 8, 10, and 12.

== Demographics ==
Historical population
Census	Pop.	Note	%±
1910	586		—
1920	532		−9.2%
1930	552		3.8%
1940	570		3.3%
1950	572		0.4%
1960	527		−7.9%
1970	448		−15.0%
1980	580		29.5%
1990	524		−9.7%
2000	590		12.6%
2010	532		−9.8%
2020	526		−1.1%
U.S. Decennial Census; 2020 Census

=== 2010 census ===
As of the census of 2010, there were 532 people, 226 households, and 144 families living in the city. The population density was 357.0 inhabitants per square mile (137.8/km^{2}). There were 319 housing units at an average density of 214.1 per square mile (82.7/km^{2}). The racial makeup of the city was 94.9% White, 0.9% African American, 1.7% Native American, 0.2% Asian, 0.4% from other races, and 1.9% from two or more races. Hispanic or Latino of any race were 1.5% of the population.

There were 226 households, of which 33.6% had children under the age of 18 living with them, 43.8% were married couples living together, 13.3% had a female householder with no husband present, 6.6% had a male householder with no wife present, and 36.3% were non-families. 33.6% of all households were made up of individuals, and 19% had someone living alone who was 65 years of age or older. The average household size was 2.35 and the average family size was 2.95.

The median age in the city was 39.7 years. 28% of residents were under the age of 18; 6.7% were between the ages of 18 and 24; 19.9% were from 25 to 44; 26.6% were from 45 to 64; and 18.8% were 65 years of age or older. The gender makeup of the city was 48.5% male and 51.5% female.

=== 2000 census ===
As of the census of 2000, there were 590 people, 256 households, and 153 families living in the city. The population density was 431.1 inhabitants per square mile (166.4/km^{2}). There were 309 housing units at an average density of 225.8 per square mile (87.2/km^{2}). The racial makeup of the city was 97.12% White, 1.02% African American, 1.19% Native American, 0.17% Asian, 0.17% from other races, and 0.34% from two or more races. Hispanic or Latino of any race were 0.51% of the population.

There were 256 households, out of which 28.1% had children under the age of 18 living with them, 46.9% were married couples living together, 9.4% had a female householder with no husband present, and 40.2% were non-families. 37.1% of all households were made up of individuals, and 23.0% had someone living alone who was 65 years of age or older. The average household size was 2.30 and the average family size was 3.08.

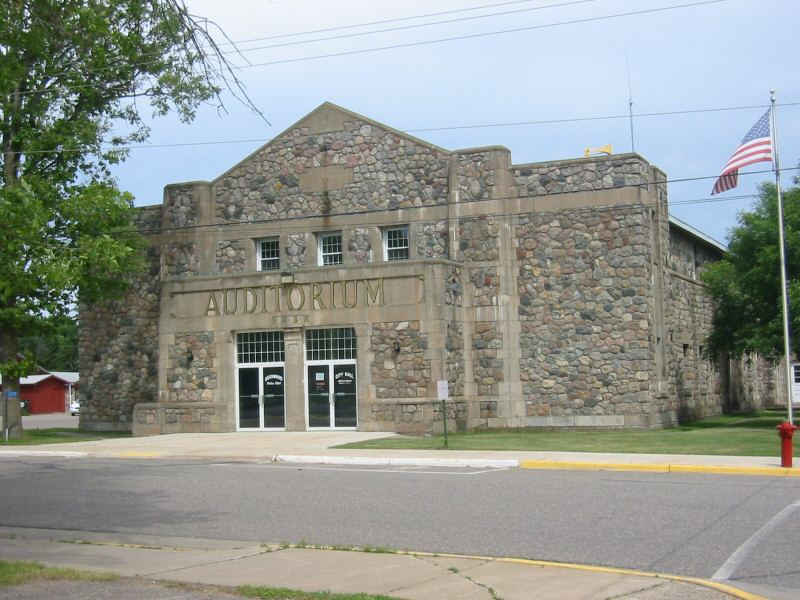
The Deerwood Auditorium in Deerwood is on the National Register of Historic Places

In the city, the population was spread out, with 27.1% under the age of 18, 6.1% from 18 to 24, 22.2% from 25 to 44, 21.7% from 45 to 64, and 22.9% who were 65 years of age or older. The median age was 41 years. For every 100 females, there were 88.5 males. For every 100 females age 18 and over, there were 88.6 males.

The median income for a household in the city was $30,069, and the median income for a family was $40,625. Males had a median income of $28,750 versus $27,813 for females. The per capita income for the city was $15,697. About 8.4% of families and 13.9% of the population were below the poverty line, including 18.3% of those under age 18 and 13.9% of those age 65 or over.

== Arts and culture ==
The Deerwood Auditorium is a community center built as a Works Progress Administration project. The auditorium, built in 1935, is listed on the National Register of Historic Places, a rare surviving example of federal relief architecture in Minnesota.
