= St. Alban's Bay Culvert =

- St. Alban's Bay Culvert at Mille Lacs Lake
- U.S. National Register of Historic Places
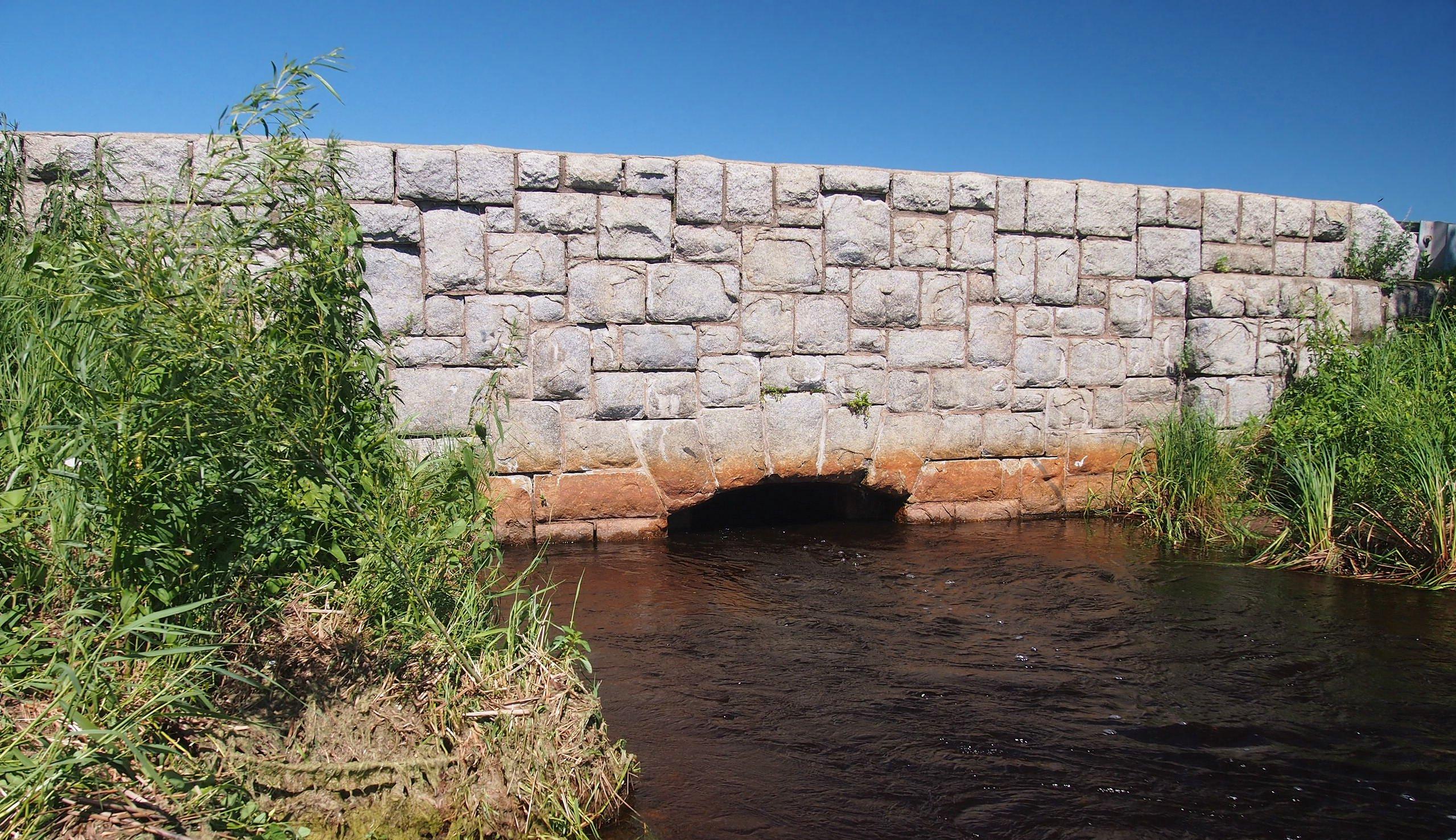
- The St. Alban's Bay Culvert from the southeast

- Location within Minnesota Location within the United States
- Location: US 169 800 feet (240 m) north of Crow Wing County Highway 26, Garrison Township, Minnesota
- Coordinates: 46°16′28.5″N 93°49′19″W
- Area: Less than one acre
- Built: 1938–9
- Built by: Civilian Conservation Corps, Minnesota Department of Highways
- Architect: Howard O. Skooglun (architect), Harold E. Olson (engineer), Arthur R. Nichols (landscape architect)
- Architectural style: National Park Service rustic
- MPS: Federal Relief Construction in Minnesota, 1933-1941
- NRHP reference No.: 15000788
- Designated: November 16, 2015

The St. Alban's Bay Culvert is a historic bridge in Garrison Township, Minnesota, United States. It carries the four-lane U.S. Route 169 (US 169) over the head of a stream flowing out of Mille Lacs Lake. It was built from 1938 to 1939 as part of a major New Deal project to create a scenic parkway along the lakeshore. The bridge was listed on the National Register of Historic Places in 2015 as the St. Alban's Bay Culvert at Mille Lacs Lake for having state-level significance in the themes of architecture and politics/government. It was nominated for being a well-preserved example of the Minnesota Highway Department's earliest scenic improvements, its rare status as a highway bridge built by the department's Roadside Development Division—a unit usually focused on overlooks and waysides—and for its fine National Park Service rustic design.

== Description ==
The St. Alban's Bay Culvert is functionally a concrete box culvert. However it has 40-foot-long (12 m) headwalls faced with random ashlar of local granite. This facing is about 9 inches (23 cm) thick, disguising a core of mortared lake boulders. The walls rise 2 feet 9 inches (84 cm) over the height of the roadbed to form a low railing. At either end of the bridge, 9-foot (2.7 m) panels of a second layer of masonry add visual interest. The culvert opening, often obscured by high water, is surmounted by a 6-foot (1.8 m) elliptical arch.

The bridge measures 72 feet 6 inches (22.10 m) wide from outside to outside, with a 66-foot (20 m) roadbed. Repaving over the years has buried the original 9-inch (23 cm) stone curbs.

== History ==
The St. Alban's Bay Culvert was built as a component of the Mille Lacs Lake Highway Improvement Plan, an ambitious New Deal project to develop the road around the northwest shore of the lake into a scenic parkway. The project was an unusual collaboration among the Minnesota Highway Department (MHD), the National Park Service (NPS), and the Civilian Conservation Corps (CCC). The agencies widened the highway from two lanes to four for 10 miles (16 km), realigned a section, constructed three wayside rests and four stone-faced bridges, and landscaped the right-of-way. The labor was primarily conducted by members of Company 2711 of the CCC, which was headquartered on the south side of Garrison, Minnesota, about a mile north of the St. Alban's Bay bridge.

The bridge was designed by Howard O. Skooglun, an architect working for the NPS. He collaborated with engineer Harold E. Olson and landscape architect Arthur R. Nichols, both with the MHD's Roadside Development Division. The trio also designed the other CCC-built components of the scenic parkway. These include the Garrison Concourse, Kenney Lake Overlook, Bridge 5265, and Bridge 3355, all of which are also listed on the National Register of Historic Places.

Construction on the St. Alban's Bay Culvert began around September 1938. It expanded an existing box culvert that had been installed in 1920, widening it from 39 feet 6 inches (12.04 m) to 72 feet 6 inches (22.10 m) to encompass the new lanes. The bridge was completed the following spring, and that summer landscaping was finished in the area by CCC Company 2713-V.

== See also ==
- List of bridges on the National Register of Historic Places in Minnesota
- National Register of Historic Places listings in Crow Wing County, Minnesota
