= Kenney Lake Overlook =

- U.S. National Register of Historic Places
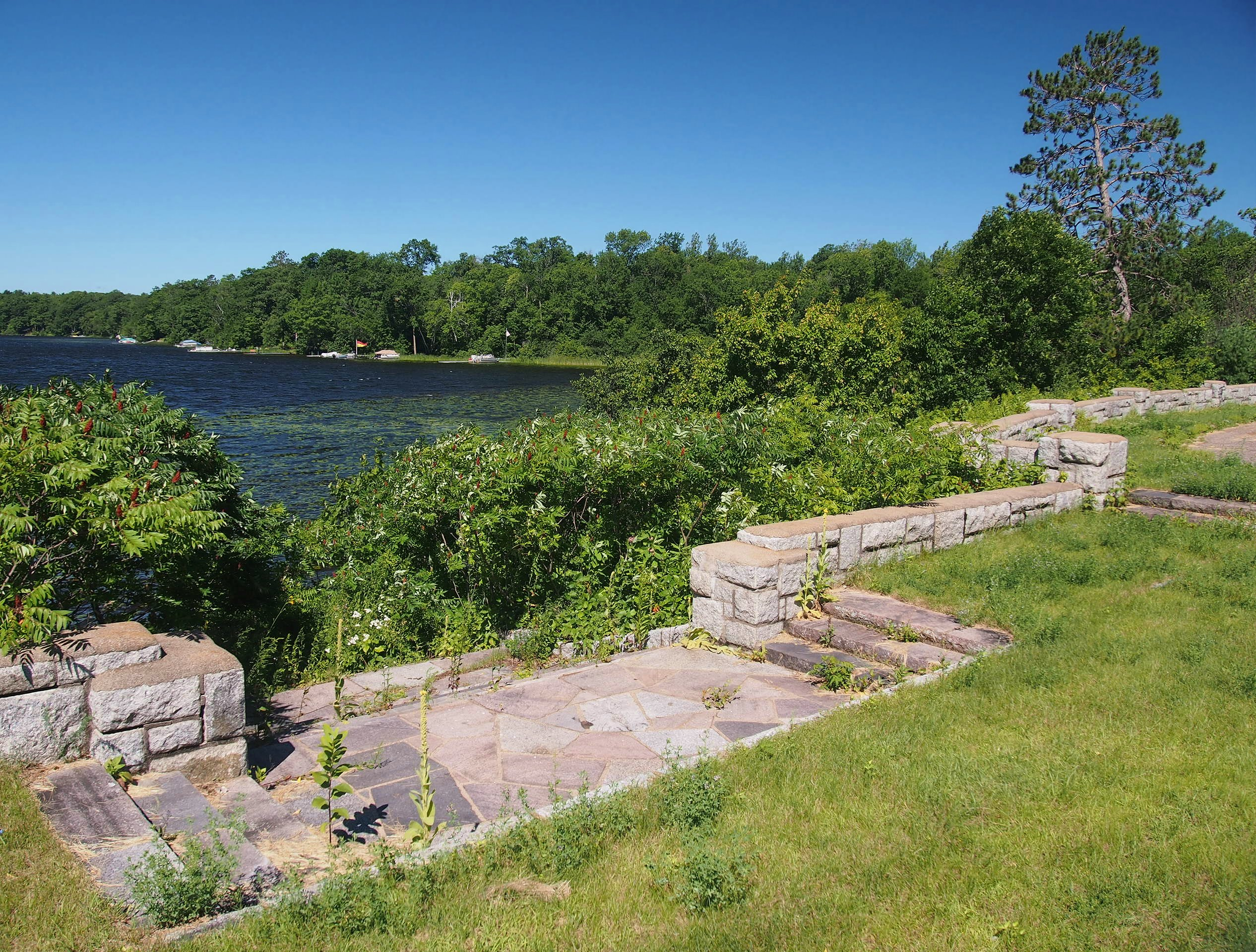
- The southeast end of the Kenney Lake Overlook

- Location within Minnesota Location within the United States
- Location: On Minnesota State Highway 18 900 feet (270 m) southeast of North Kenney Lake Lane, Garrison Township, Minnesota
- Coordinates: 46°19′38″N 93°50′34″W
- Area: Approximately 2 acres (0.8 ha)
- Built: 1939
- Built by: Civilian Conservation Corps–Veterans Division, Minnesota Department of Highways
- Architect: Howard O. Skooglun (architect), Harold E. Olson (engineer), A.R. Nichols (landscape architect)
- Architectural style: National Park Service rustic
- MPS: Federal Relief Construction in Minnesota, 1933–1941
- NRHP reference No.: 15000789
- Designated: November 16, 2015

The Kenney Lake Overlook is a historic roadside park in Garrison Township, Minnesota, United States. Adjacent to the southbound lane of Minnesota State Highway 18 (MN 18), the two-acre (0.8 ha) site provides a parking area and an overlook of a small lake. The wayside was built in 1939 as part of a major New Deal project to create a scenic parkway along the shore of nearby Mille Lacs Lake. The Mille Lacs Highway Development Plan was the largest highway improvement project in the state constructed by the Civilian Conservation Corps (CCC). The Kenney Lake Overlook was listed on the National Register of Historic Places in 2015 for having state-level significance in the themes of landscape architecture and politics/government. It was nominated for being a key component of a major highway improvement project, for representing the work of the Veterans Division of the CCC and the earliest scenic improvements of the Minnesota Highway Department (MHD), and for its fine National Park Service rustic design.

== Description ==
The Kenney Lake Overlook stretches for about 600 feet (180 m) along MN 18 where it passes the northeast shore of Kenney Lake. The overlook is 2.5 miles (4.0 km) from Garrison and the northwest shore of Mille Lacs Lake. The site consists of a pullthrough parking area with stone curbs, and a stone overlook wall with stairs 12 feet (3.7 m) down to the lakeshore. As originally designed there was a picnic area to the southeast with picnic tables, a pair of benches at the northwest end of the overlook, and a wooden entrance sign, but these features are no longer extant. A wooden dock was planned at the base of the stairs but may never have been built. Naturalistic plantings once completed the scene. As of the mid-2010s, however, the site has lost some trees and the lakeshore is overgrown.

The parking area is about 150 feet (46 m) long, with access to and from the highway at either end of a 90-foot-long (27 m) traffic island. Curbs of rough-cut granite blocks line the parking area and continue for a short distance in either direction along the road shoulder. Over half of the original curbing (on the east side of the traffic island and for a greater distance before and after the pullout) was removed when the highway was widened in 1982.

The overlook wall stretches for about 250 feet (76 m). It is constructed of light-grey granite blocks laid in a random pattern over a stone rubble core. The granite is the same as that used in the stone curbing, but is more finely dressed. The central part of the wall curves in a shallow arc around the parking area for 165 feet (50 m). It is about two feet (0.6 m) high on the inside and up to nine feet (2.7 m) high facing the lake. Thicker piers at 24-foot (7.3 m) intervals lend an air of medieval battlements.

At the northwest end the wall continues into a 24-foot (7.3 m) diameter semicircle. The original plans refer to this as the "niche" and it was carefully built around an existing oak tree. From the outside the niche suggested a castle tower, and a drainage opening was even designed to resemble an arrowslit. The niche's floor is recessed slightly from the level of the parking lot and it provided a more intimate seating area with two benches. Both the benches and the tree are no longer extant.

At the southeast end, the overlook broadens into a terrace. Symmetrical 16-foot (4.9 m) sections of wall flank a recessed area paved with flagstones which gives onto a staircase leading down to the lakeshore.

== History ==
The Kenney Lake Overlook was built as a component of the Mille Lacs Lake Highway Improvement Plan, an ambitious New Deal project to transform the area around the northwest shore of the lake into a scenic parkway. The project was an unusual collaboration among the MHD, the National Park Service, and the CCC. The overlook is among the first generation of roadside parks established by the MHD in the 1930s and 40s to improve highway aesthetics, increase safety, and aid the nascent automobile tourism industry by providing scenic areas for motorists to relax, eat, and use restrooms in the years before gas stations and convenience stores became commonplace.

The overlook was designed by Howard O. Skooglun, an architect working for the NPS. He collaborated with engineer Harold E. Olson and landscape architect A.R. Nichols, both with the MHD's Roadside Development Division. The trio also designed the other CCC-built components of the scenic parkway. These include the Garrison Concourse, Bridge 5265, Bridge 3355, and St. Alban's Bay Culvert, all of which are also listed on the National Register of Historic Places.

From September 1935 to April 1940, various CCC companies cycled through a camp just south of Garrison as work progressed on the Mille Lacs Lake Highway Improvement Plan. Company 2713-V arrived at the Garrison Camp in July 1939. The company had been established in August 1934 and spent its first two years developing Camden State Park in southwest Minnesota, then three years completing Fort Ridgely State Park in the south-central part of the state. Individual enrollees, however, only served for about nine months. While the regular companies of the CCC were for men under the age of 25, the Veterans Division was established to accept older men—veterans of World War I who had been particularly hard hit by unemployment during the Great Depression, due in part to age discrimination and high incidences of post-war physical and mental disabilities.

When the overlook was constructed, MN 18 was a gravel road built through the area just six years earlier as part of a 1932–33 realignment. Stone for the wall and curbs came from a nearby quarry five miles (8.0 km) south of Isle, Minnesota. Granite was also obtained from quarries near St. Cloud. The masonry was completed in October 1939 and the landscaping was finished the following month, completing the project. The company continued to work in the vicinity until April 1940, when it relocated to the St. Croix Recreational Demonstration Area.

Minnesota hosted over 100 CCC companies, but only about six of them comprised veterans. The Mille Lacs project was also rare in that, statewide, only four camps total were sponsored by the MHD for road development. The Kenny Lake Overlook and the nearby Bridge 3355 are the only structures built for the Minnesota Highway Department by a Veterans Division company.

== See also ==
- National Register of Historic Places listings in Crow Wing County, Minnesota
