= Inspiration Point Wayside Rest =

- U.S. National Register of Historic Places
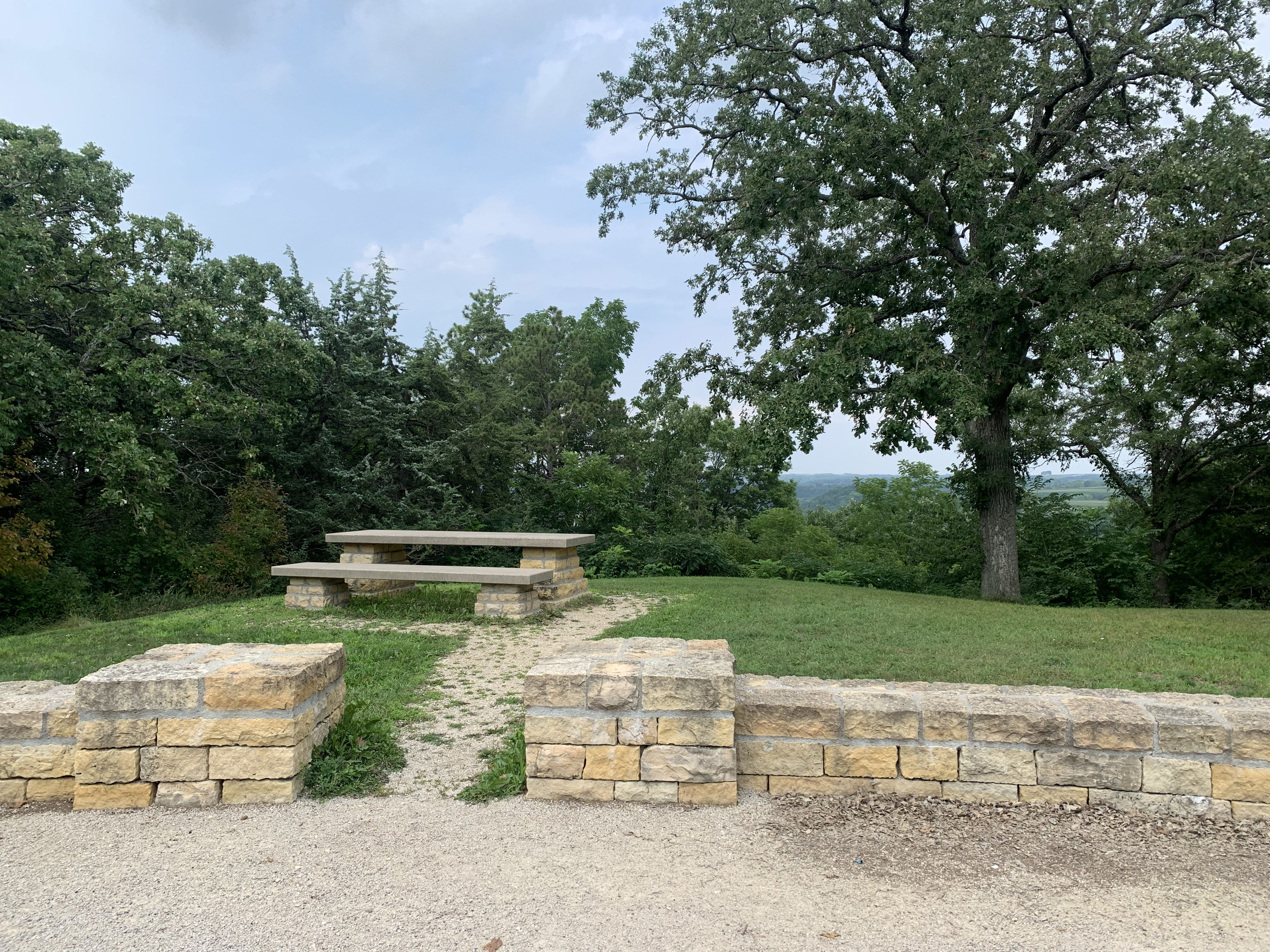
- Inspiration Point Wayside Rest, looking northeast towards the Root River Valley

- Location within Minnesota Location within the United States
- Location: On MN 16, 2 miles (3.2 km) southwest of County Road 21, Lanesboro, Minnesota
- Coordinates: 43°41′39″N 91°59′44″W
- Area: Approximately 69 acres (28 ha)
- Built: 1934-1937
- Built by: Minnesota Department of Highways, Civilian Conservation Corps
- Architect: Arthur R. Nichols
- Architectural style: National Park Service rustic
- MPS: Federal Relief Construction in Minnesota, 1933–1941
- NRHP reference No.: 15000790
- Designated: November 16, 2015

Inspiration Point Wayside Rest is a state highway wayside rest located along Minnesota State Highway 16 southwest of Lanesboro, Fillmore County, Minnesota. Minnesotan architect Arthur R. Nichols designed the wayside and it was built between 1934 and 1937 by the Minnesota Department of Transportation (MnDOT) and the Civilian Conservation Corps. In 2015, Inspiration Point Wayside Rest was listed on the National Register of Historic Places as a well-preserved example of the National Park Service rustic architectural style with good historic integrity, and the only surviving Minnesota wayside to have been built by a CCC soil erosion control camp. Major renovation work was undertaken that same year to restore degrading masonry and clear invasive buckthorn that had blocked several of the wayside's viewpoints.

== History and design ==
The Inspiration Point Wayside Rest was one of thousands of infrastructure projects completed during the Great Depression by New Deal Agencies. President Franklin Delano Roosevelt created the Civilian Conservation Corps (CCC) through Executive Order 6106-A in April 1933, and the CCC had over 60 camps in Minnesota by the following August. Fourteen more were operated in coordination with the Minnesota Conservation Department (now the Minnesota DNR) to address drought and erosion control in southeast Minnesota. This included Camp SCS-7 / PE-91 / 751 in Lanesboro, which was responsible for the construction of Inspiration Point Wayside Rest in 1934 according to the Fillmore County Historical Society. Gemini Research claims the property was instead built by workers paid by the Federal/State Emergency Relief Administration (FERA/SERA).

Inspiration Point was one of the first rest areas Arthur R. Nichols designed under commission of the Minnesota Highway Department. Nichols later designed many similar rest areas throughout the 1930s and 1940s in Minnesota, such as Preston Overlook, Kenney Lake Overlook, Orr Roadside Parking Area, and Reads Landing Overlook, but Inspiration Point is unique in the dry stone masonry techniques found in most of its walls. Dry stone masonry uses no mortar, instead interlacing stones in tight patterns that are durable but can accommodate drainage and ice accumulation.

The wayside rest is located atop Duschee Hill, one of the largest hills in the region, and its surrounding terrain consists of pronounced hills and ravines. Predominant local land uses include natural oak and hardwood forests – which were incorporated into the site's original design – as well as tilled fields and pastureland.

== Restoration efforts ==
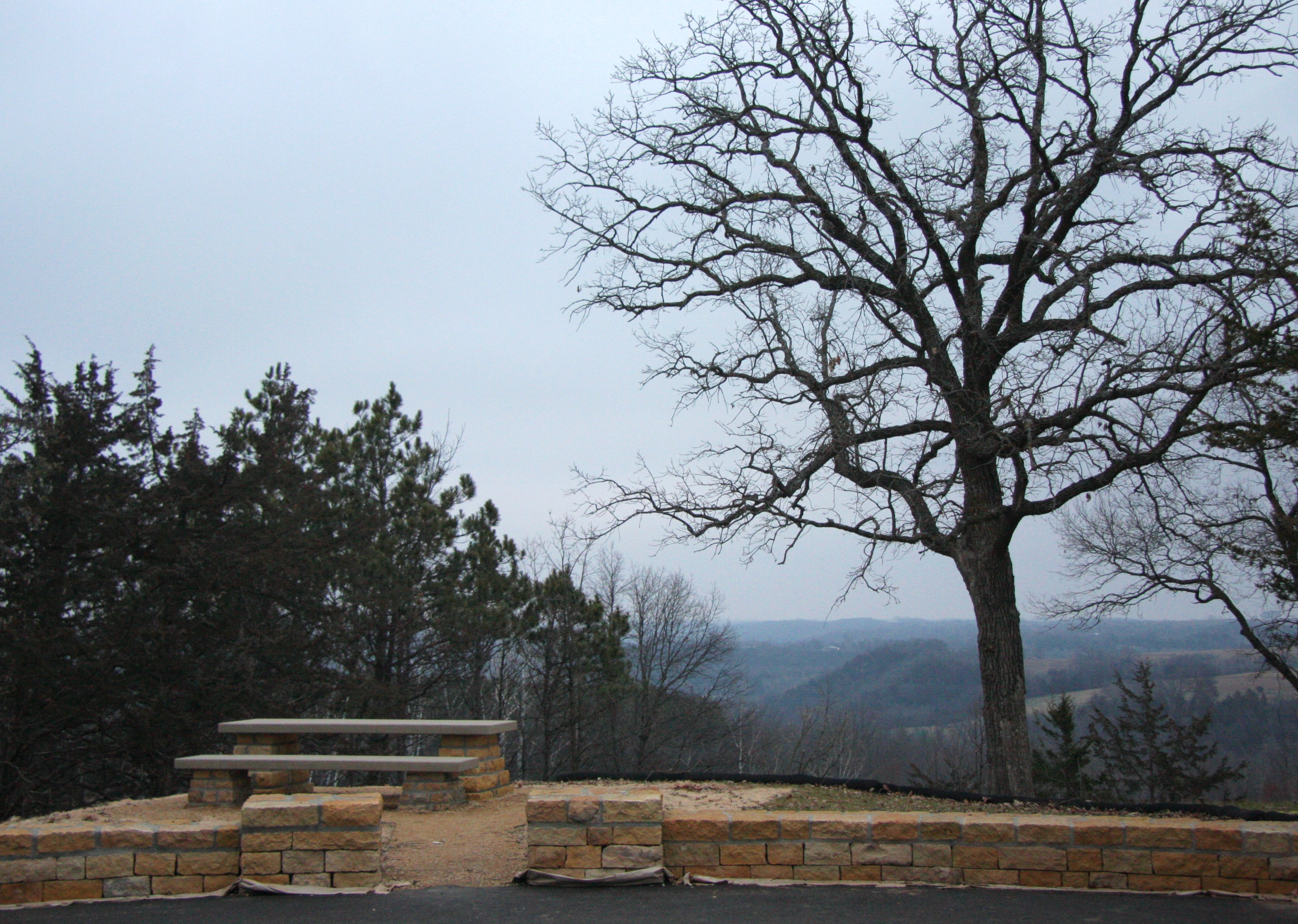
Inspiration Point in 2015, towards the end of major restoration efforts

In the early 2010s, MnDOT conducted condition assessments and background research on Inspiration Point in preparation for a National Register of Historic Places listing application. The site was successfully designated on the NRHP list on November 16, 2015, but the wayside's condition deteriorated. Buckthorn and other invasive vegetation near the wayside blocked intended overlooks of the Root River Valley below, several of the site's signature walls had significant cracks, and some benches were structurally undermined. MnDOT estimated in 2013 that it would cost $1,262,615 (USD) to fully restore the wayside and protect it from future damage. Restoration work, led by the contractor firm Environmental Associates, was carried out in 2015 and ultimately cost approximately $1.18 million (USD). The renovation focused mostly on restoring the masonry of the stone walls and on clearing the buckthorn that had obscured the Point's views of the surrounding valley.
