= Garrison Concourse =

Historic roadside park in Minnesota, U.S.

- U.S. National Register of Historic Places
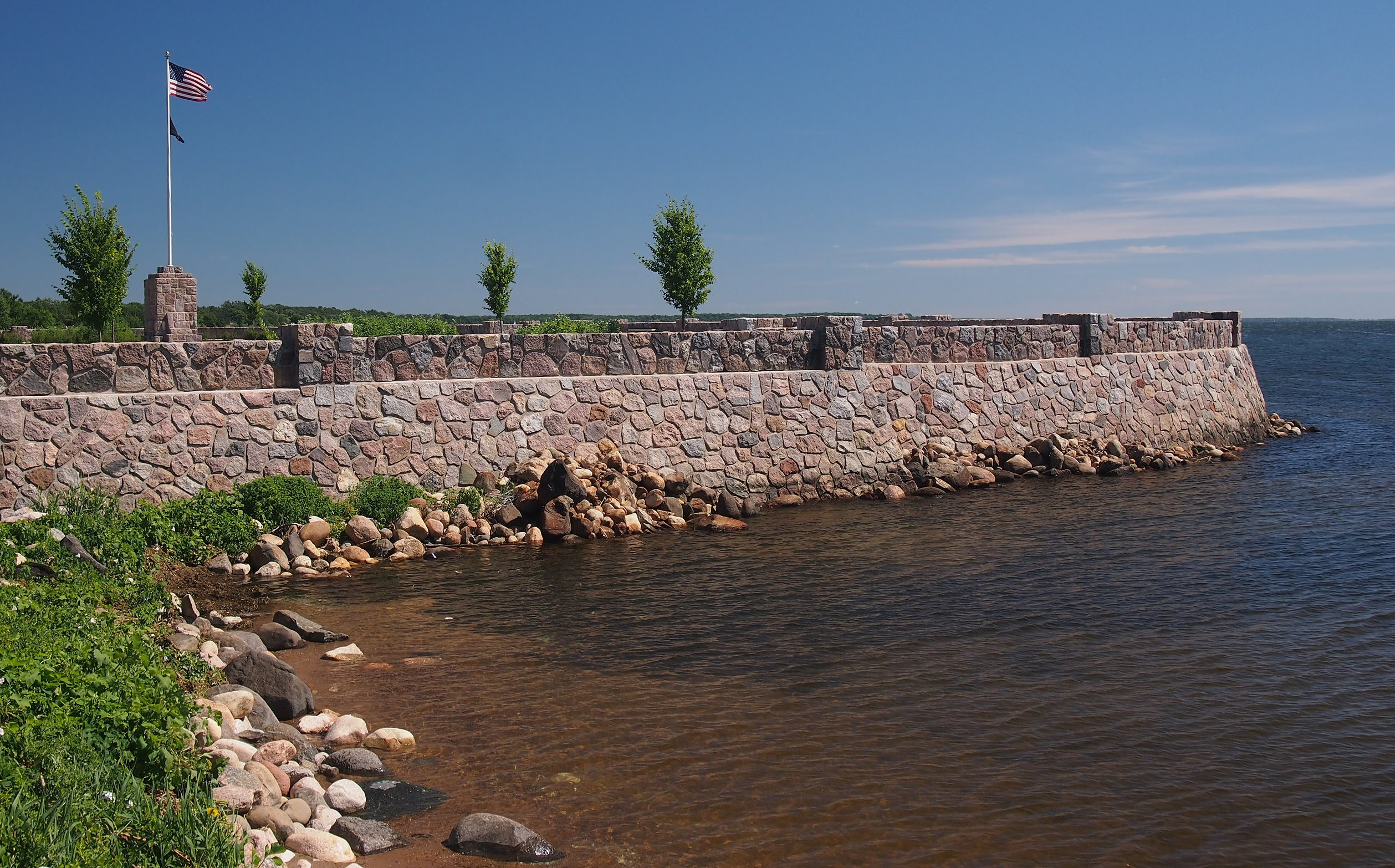
- The Garrison Concourse viewed from the south

- Location within Minnesota Location within the United States
- Location: Junction of U.S. Route 169 & Minnesota State Highway 18, Garrison, Minnesota
- Coordinates: 46°17′39″N 93°49′26″W
- Area: 6.3 acres (2.5 ha)
- Built: 1936–1939
- Built by: Civilian Conservation Corps, Minnesota Highway Department
- Architect: Edward W. Barber (architect), Arthur R. Nichols (landscape architect), Harold E. Olson (engineer)
- Architectural style: National Park Service rustic
- MPS: Federal Relief Construction in Minnesota, 1933–1941
- NRHP reference No.: 13000882
- Designated: December 3, 2013

The Garrison Concourse is a roadside park on Mille Lacs Lake in Garrison, Minnesota, United States. The site consists of a wide parking area and scenic overlook projecting out into the lake, plus landscaped parkland along the shore in both directions. It was built from 1936 to 1939 as the centerpiece of the Mille Lacs Highway Development Plan, a major New Deal project to create a scenic parkway along the lakeshore. The park was listed on the National Register of Historic Places in 2013 for having state-level significance in the themes of landscape architecture and politics/government. It was nominated for being the premiere structure of the most extensive roadside development project undertaken by the Minnesota Highway Department and the Civilian Conservation Corps, and for its blend of formalism and National Park Service rustic design.

== Description ==
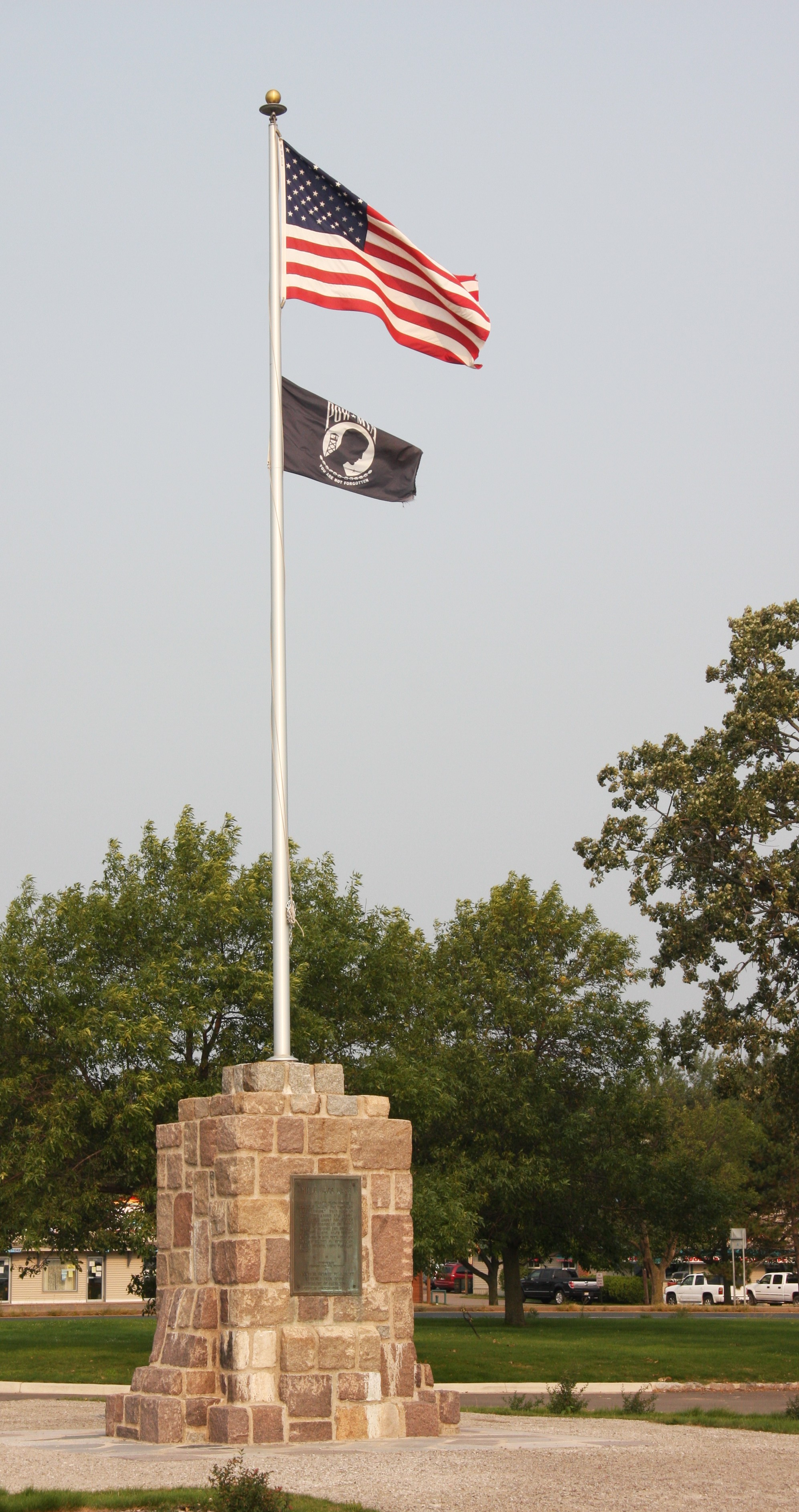
The Garrison Concourse's central monument

The Garrison Concourse stands on the northwest shore of Mille Lacs Lake, a major destination for recreational fishing. It was built on U.S. Route 169—which runs between Minneapolis–Saint Paul and the Iron Range cities—at its junction with Minnesota State Highway 18, leading toward Brainerd and several other major fishing lakes.

The principal feature is the overlook, a D-shaped platform with a paved driveway and parking area surrounding a central island, and a curving stone walkway around the periphery. The platform measures 335 feet (102 m) north to south and 190 feet (58 m) east to west, and projects 160 feet (49 m) into the lake.

The overlook wall consists of large blocks of granite, roughly finished and laid in a random pattern. The walls are two feet (61 cm) thick and rise three feet (0.9 m) above the inner walkway. Three-foot (0.9 m) stone piers are spaced at intervals. The inner walkway widens in three places to provide space for sightseers to congregate. A 120-foot (37 m) bay is centered on the lakeward side of the platform, while 70-foot (21 m) bays stand at both landward corners.

The central island was designed with formal plantings delineated by a grid of walkways. A 16-foot-square (4.9 m) flagstone plaza in the center surrounds a stone monument, which serves as a mount for an interpretive plaque and the base of a flagpole. Six-inch-high (15 cm) stone curbing once defined much of the grounds. The only surviving original sections, however, are around the central island and a 230-foot (70 m) stretch along the highway shoulder south of the overlook. Native trees and shrubs pepper the open space on either side of the overlook.

The National Register listing is broken down into four contributing properties: one site (the designed landscape itself) and three structures (the overlook wall, the monument, and the granite curbing). Two elements built in more recent times are considered noncontributing properties: a fiberglass statue of a giant walleye erected around 1980 and a small visitor information booth built around 1990.

== Origin ==
Mille Lacs Lake arose as a popular visitor destination in the early 20th century, first through rail access but then by automobile as a scenic highway was designated along its western shore in 1917 and as cars became affordable for middle-class families. It was the first large lake encountered by motorists traveling north out of Minneapolis–Saint Paul. By the 1920s the highway along Mille Lacs Lake was the state's most traveled, providing access to a growing number of tourist amenities nearby as well as destinations just beyond it in the directions of Brainerd and Aitkin. The road became U.S. Route 169 in 1931.

In the 1930s the Minnesota Highway Department began an ambitious series of improvement projects to realign roadways and establish scenic waysides, taking advantage of federal funds and labor provided by the New Deal to combat the Great Depression. The work was intended to improve highway aesthetics, increase safety, and aid the nascent automobile tourism industry by providing scenic areas for motorists to relax, eat, and use restrooms in the years before gas stations and convenience stores became commonplace.

The Garrison Concourse was designed on a large scale, both to accommodate the number of visitors it would see and to match the scale of Mille Lacs Lake. It is the third largest of more than 50 overlooks built by the Minnesota Highway Department during the New Deal, and the only one to project into a body of water.

== Construction ==
The Mille Lacs Lake Highway Wayside Camp, or SP-15, was established just outside the small town of Garrison. It housed a rotating population of 200 men employed by the Civilian Conservation Corps. The camp was operated by the U.S. Army, while the work projects were directed by the National Park Service and the Minnesota Highway Department. Of the 120 Civilian Conservation Corps camps established in Minnesota, only four were attached to the Minnesota Highway Department. SP-15 was the longest lived of the four—active for four and a half years—and produced the most extensive accomplishments. The camp laborers were initially 18–25-year-olds, but later it hosted a company of older men who were veterans of World War I.

Work on the Garrison Concourse began in spring 1936. First they relocated to the north a small monument to William Tauer, a local hotelier who had drowned while trying to save boaters in distress during a June 1927 storm. During the summer of 1936 the Civilian Conservation Corps enrollees built a cofferdam to hold back the lakewater and laid the footings of the overlook wall. Extreme heat and a reassignment to help fight forest fires up north slowed progress, but the following year the overlook wall was mostly completed. The overlook plaza was built up with gravel, clay, and stone fill. The men also created a 350-foot (110 m) sandy beach north of the overlook to complement the natural beach on the south side. From 1938 to 1939, the workers completed the central plaza and its monument, stonework, benches, landscaping, and planting.

In addition to the Garrison Concourse, Camp SP-15 widened the highway from two lanes to four for 10 miles (16 km), realigned a section, constructed two other wayside rests and four stone-faced bridges, and landscaped the right-of-way. This fell far short of the original hope to develop a scenic highway all the way around the lake, but it was still Minnesota's most extensive highway development project of the New Deal era. Camp SP-15's other projects in the area include the Kenney Lake Overlook, Bridge 5265, and Bridge 3355, and the St. Alban's Bay Culvert, each of which is also listed on the National Register of Historic Places.

== Restoration ==
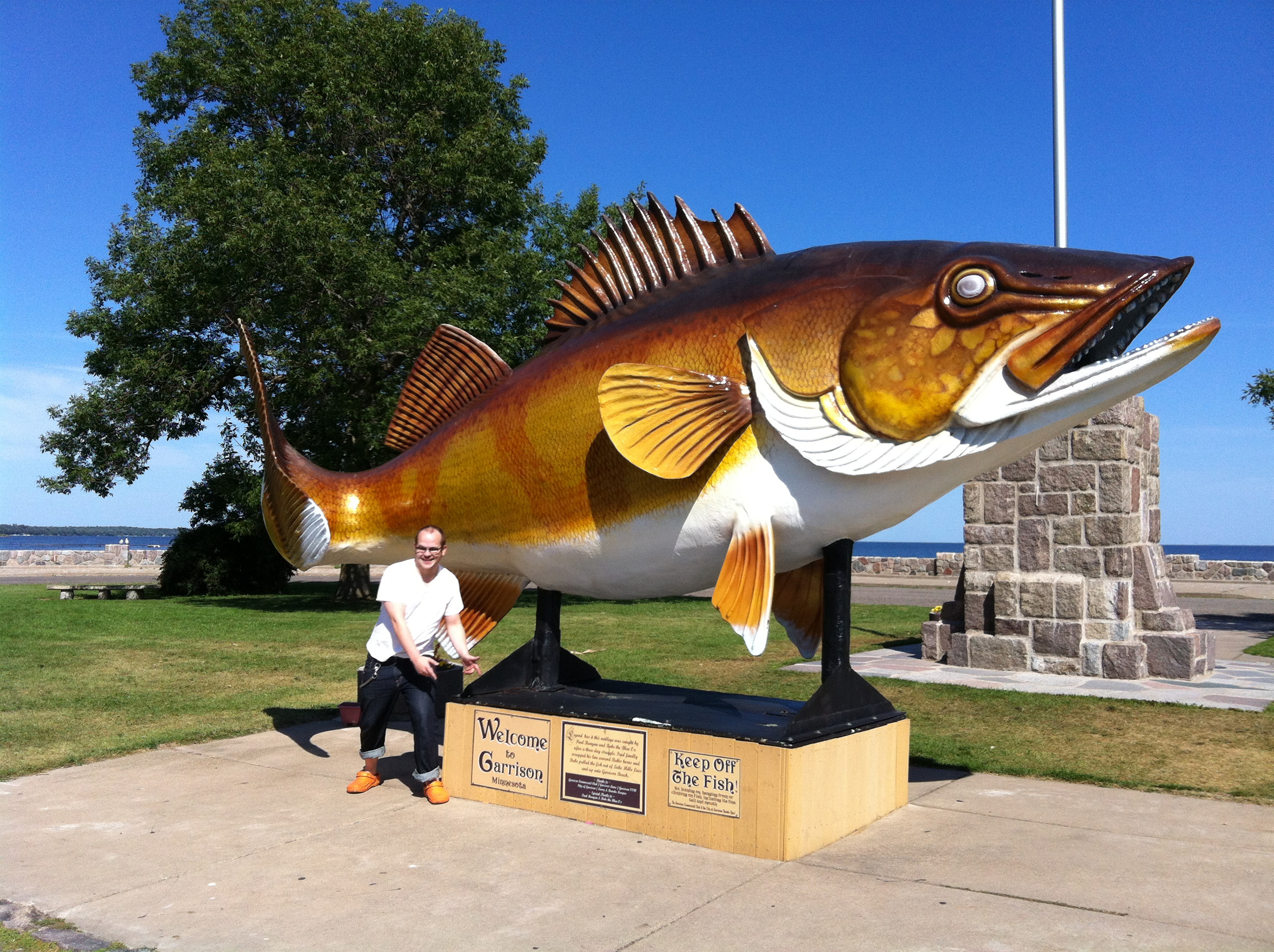
Garrison's giant walleye statue stood here in the middle of the plaza from 1980 to 2013

The Garrison Concourse was extensively restored beginning in 2011. Ice and wave action had taken a toll on the overlook wall, and the plaza had deteriorated. The Preservation Alliance of Minnesota had placed it on their 2010 "10 most endangered historic places" list. The state highway department—now renamed the Minnesota Department of Transportation (MnDOT)—performed the work to meet federal standards for historic properties. Loose stones were reset and missing stones replaced with similar material. Several stones knocked out of the overlook wall were recovered from the lakebed and fitted back into place. Repairs were made to the plaza and flagpole monument. The walleye statue and information booth, which had been placed in the middle of the plaza in the late 20th century, were moved a short distance to be less visually obtrusive.

== See also ==
- National Register of Historic Places listings in Crow Wing County, Minnesota
