= Reads Landing Overlook =

- U.S. National Register of Historic Places
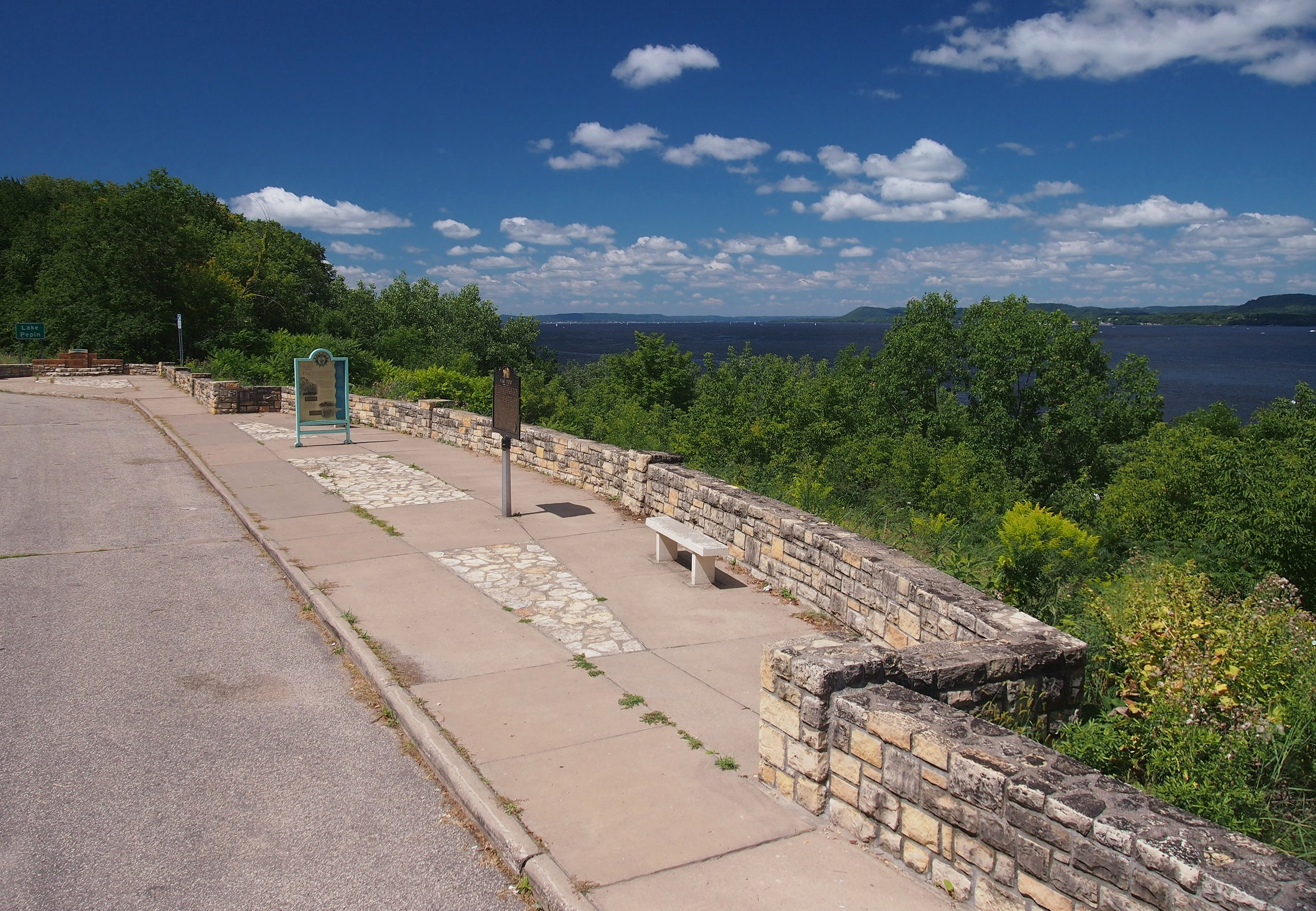
- View to the northwest at the Reads Landing Overlook

- Location within Minnesota Location within the United States
- Location: U.S. Route 61, Pepin Township, Minnesota
- Coordinates: 44°24′36″N 92°06′27″W
- Area: 3.6 acres (1.5 ha)
- Built: 1939–40
- Built by: National Youth Administration, Minnesota Department of Highways
- Architect: Harold E. Olson (engineer), A.R. Nichols (landscape architect)
- Architectural style: National Park Service rustic
- MPS: Federal Relief Construction in Minnesota, 1933–1941
- NRHP reference No.: 04001359
- Designated: December 15, 2004

The Reads Landing Overlook is a scenic overlook on U.S. Route 61 in Pepin Township, Minnesota, United States. It was built from 1939 to 1940 as a New Deal project to provide motorists with a scenic view of Lake Pepin. It was designed by landscape architect Arthur R. Nichols and constructed by the National Youth Administration. The overlook was listed on the National Register of Historic Places in 2004 for its state-level significance in the themes of landscape architecture and politics/government. It was nominated for exemplifying the early highway waysides built in Minnesota with federal work relief aid, and for exemplifying as well National Park Service rustic style and the work of Nichols.

== Description ==
The Reads Landing Overlook stands 1.5 miles (2.4 km) northwest of Reads Landing, Minnesota, and five miles (8 km) southeast of Lake City. It is situated on a stretch of Route 61 that runs due east-west along the south shore of Lake Pepin, a natural widening of the Mississippi River. Views from the overlook encompass the lake and its surrounding river valley, which is lined by wooded, 400-foot (120 m) bluffs on either shore. The bluffs of the south shore rise immediately adjacent to the roadbed of Route 61.

The overlook is built on a narrow strip of fill between the highway and a line of shoreside railroad tracks. The overlook's lakeside edge is defined by a 230-foot-long (70 m) retaining wall of random-coursed ashlars of Oneota Dolomite. The wall is 18 inches (46 cm) thick with two-foot-square (61 cm) piers anchoring it at regular intervals. The midpoint of the symmetrical wall is bowed out to create a 90-foot-long (27 m) lookout bay that projects farther out toward the lake. At either end of the site, the retaining wall curves into bays with interpretive markers. The parking area has parallel parking space for four cars. A six-foot-wide (1.8 m) island with a stone curb once separated the parking area from the highway. This and a five-car parking area on the opposite side of the road were largely eliminated when the highway was widened.

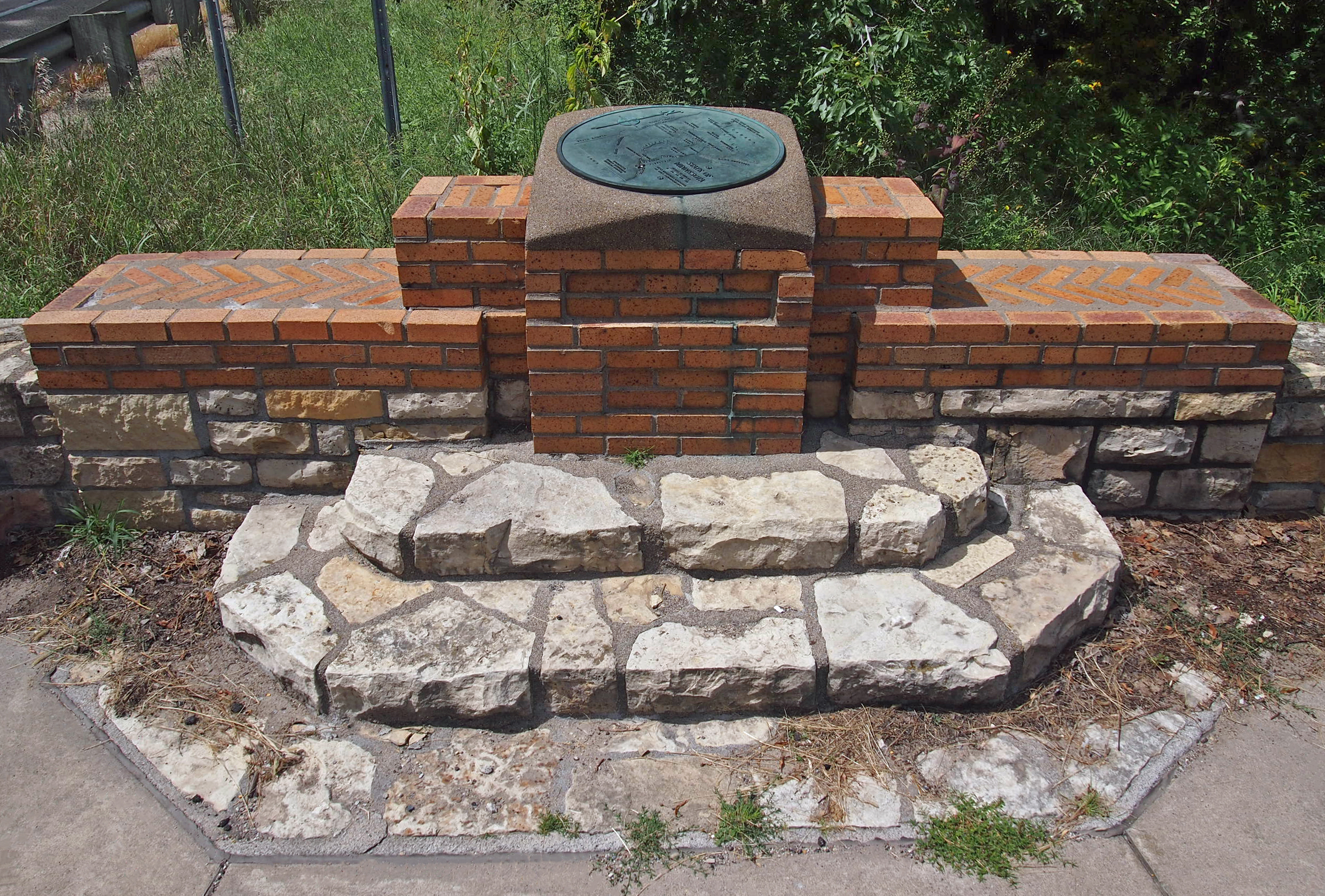
The west interpretive marker

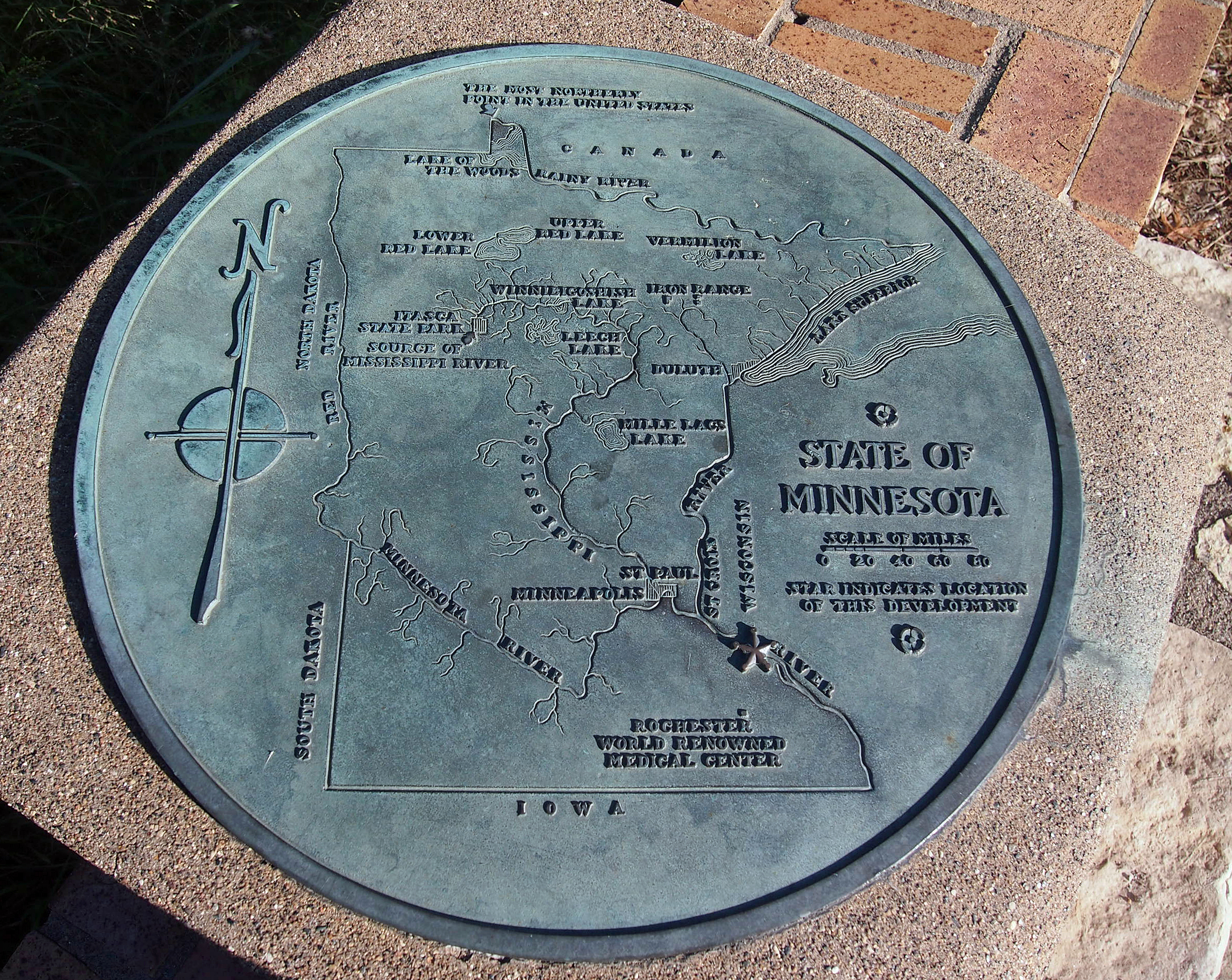
Detail of the west interpretive marker

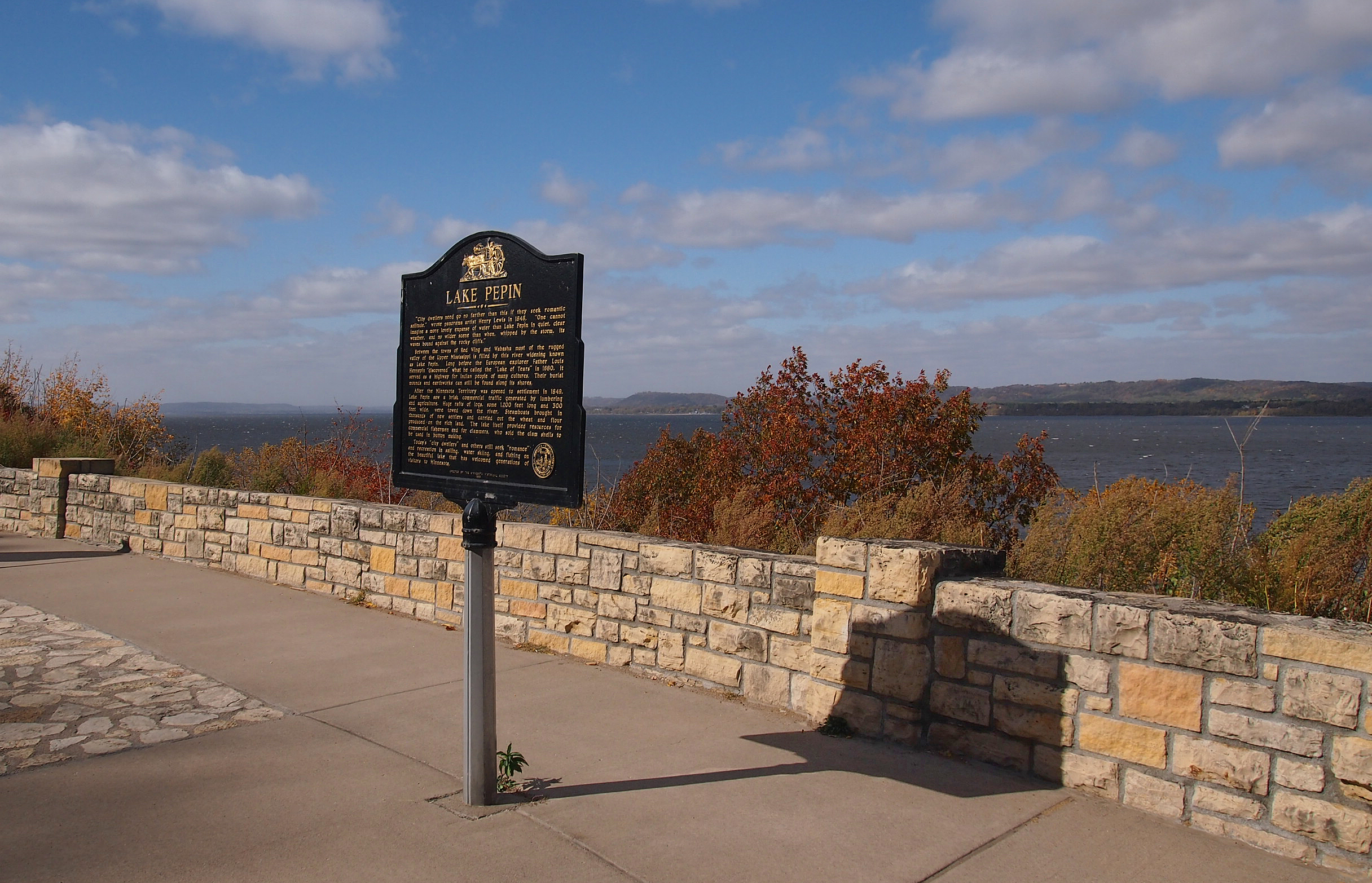
The lookout bay and a 1985 historical marker

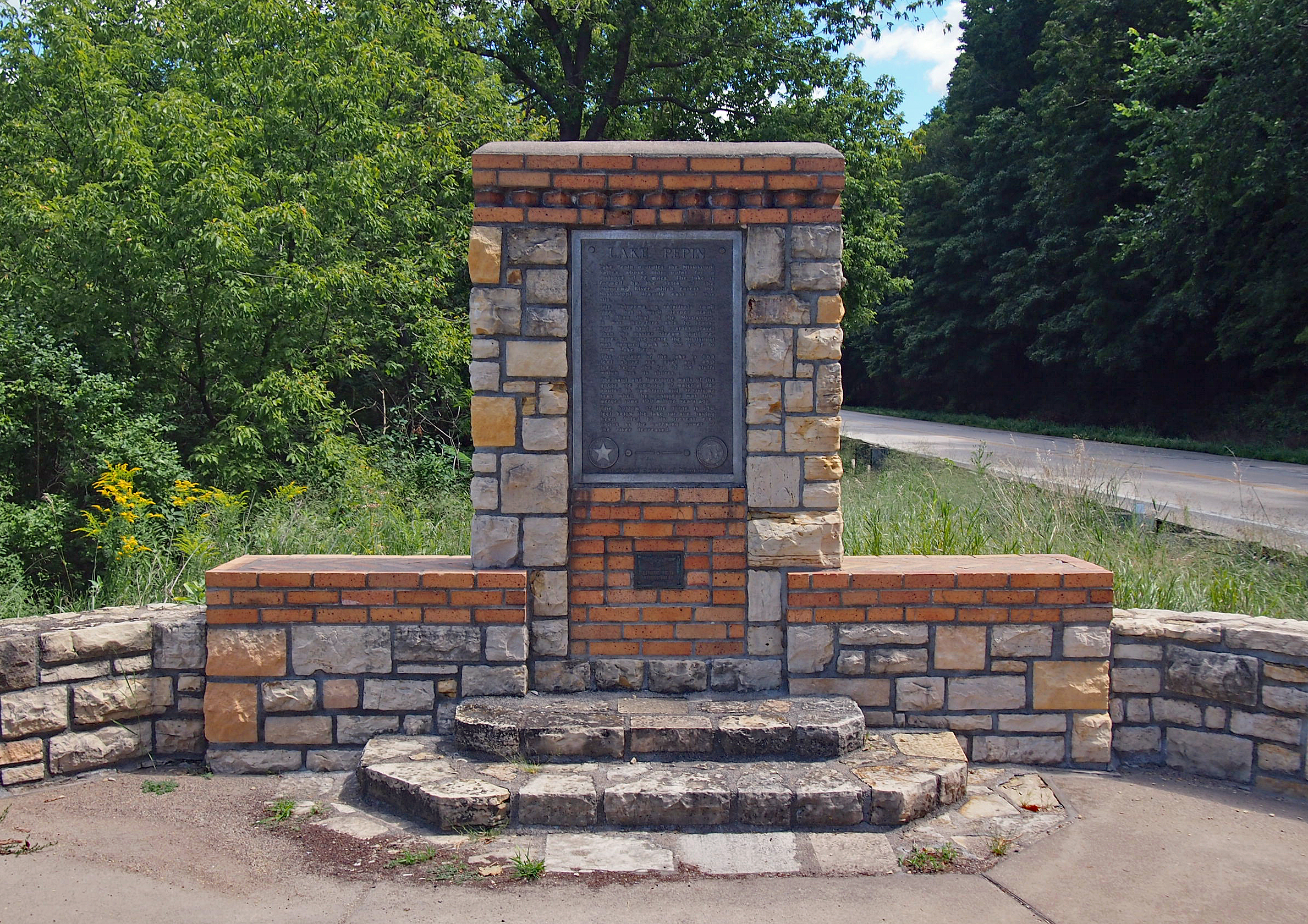
The east interpretive marker

The interpretive marker at the east end of the overlook is an aluminum plaque with text regarding Lake Pepin. It is set into a freestanding wall of dolomite with decorative brickwork. Below the main plaque is a small bronze marker crediting construction to the National Youth Administration. The interpretive marker at the west end is unique. It takes the form of a 26-inch-diameter (66 cm) bronze medallion with a geographical map of Minnesota. It is set on top of a square brick pedestal. The east and west markers are both flanked by walls with decorative herringbone brickwork and sport wide limestone steps at their feet.

The overlook plaza was originally paved with flagstones punctuated by five insets paved with asphalt. In 1994 the Minnesota Department of Transportation (MnDOT) repaved the plaza with poured concrete to make it more handicap-accessible. Some of the flagstones were retained and placed in the configuration of the original asphalt insets, inverting the initial design but retaining the contrast of smooth and flagged surfaces. At the same time MnDOT added two concrete benches to the lookout bay, making up for the three limestone benches that had deteriorated and been removed over the intervening decades.

The lookout bay sports two interpretive signs added in the late 20th century. The first is a traditional black metal marker on a pole, placed in 1985 by MnDOT and the Minnesota Historical Society. The second is a modern interpretive sign printed on plastic, installed by MnDOT and the Minnesota Department of Natural Resources in 1988 and slightly relocated during the 1994 renovations.

== History ==
The Reads Landing Overlook is a distinctive example of Minnesota's first highway waysides, established in the 1930s and 40s as automobile tourism became popular. Overlooks were designed to provide a standard place for motorists to pull safely off the road for scenic views, rather than stopping randomly on road shoulders. The Reads Landing Overlook is uniquely adapted to a very narrow site and atypically combines elements of a scenic wayside with those of an interpretive wayside.

The adjacent highway was promoted as a scenic route from the first days of automobile touring in the 1910s. At that time the road system was not yet codified, and private groups took charge of marking and promoting routes. In 1921 the state highway system was formally organized, with this road along Minnesota's eastern border from Iowa to Canada becoming Highway 1. Four years later it was designated as part of U.S. Route 61. Long a gravel road, 61 was first paved through this vicinity in 1936. Owing to its importance and heavy use, the initial paving was done in concrete rather than cheaper but less durable asphalt. In 1938 an interstate commission formed to plan the Great River Road. Though Minnesota's portion would not be officialized until 1959, the portion along Lake Pepin was recognized as a scenic highlight from the beginning.

As use of the highway system expanded, the Minnesota Highway Department (later renamed the Minnesota Department of Transportation or MnDOT) opened the Roadside Development Division to concentrate on wayside facilities. The goal of these facilities was to improve highway aesthetics, increase safety, and aid the nascent automobile tourism industry by providing places for motorists to relax, eat, and use restrooms in the years before rest areas and convenience stores became commonplace. The waysides were generally designed in the National Park Service Rustic style, which emphasized the use of natural materials that would harmonize with the local environment and also endure with minimal maintenance.

Like most of Minnesota's early waysides, the Reads Landing Overlook was designed by landscape architect Arthur R. Nichols in consultation with MHD engineer Harold E. Olson. Nichols drew up his plans in August 1939 and they were approved with some revisions the following month. His design was adapted to the uniquely narrow site, squeezed at the base of a bluff between the highway and a sharp drop-off to railroad tracks and the lakeshore. As a consequence, it resembles interpretive waysides like the Craigie Flour Mill Historical Marker rather than broad overlooks like the Garrison Concourse and Stillwater Overlook. Dolomite from the area was cut and laid with great attention to craftsmanship. Decorative accents were built with an orange/pink brick selected to contrast with the tan stone. The symmetrical plan and fine brick detailing exemplify the sophisticated formalism with which Nichols frequently imbued his rustic style designs.

Labor was provided through the National Youth Administration (NYA), a New Deal agency organized to provide employment and developmental opportunities for younger workers aged 16 to 25. About 184,500 Minnesotans participated in the NYA from 1935 to 1943, building parks, playgrounds, highways, and public buildings. NYA labor produced at least 19 highway waysides for the Roadside Development Division in Minnesota, as well as picnic tables installed at many more sites.

The Reads Landing Overlook was one of five wayside rests built by the Roadside Development Division along Route 61 near Lake Pepin, four of which are still extant. Only three other areas of the state received similar concentrations of waysides in this era: the North Shore, Mille Lacs Lake, and around Stillwater.

== See also ==
- National Register of Historic Places listings in Wabasha County, Minnesota
