= Craigie Flour Mill Historical Marker =

- U.S. National Register of Historic Places
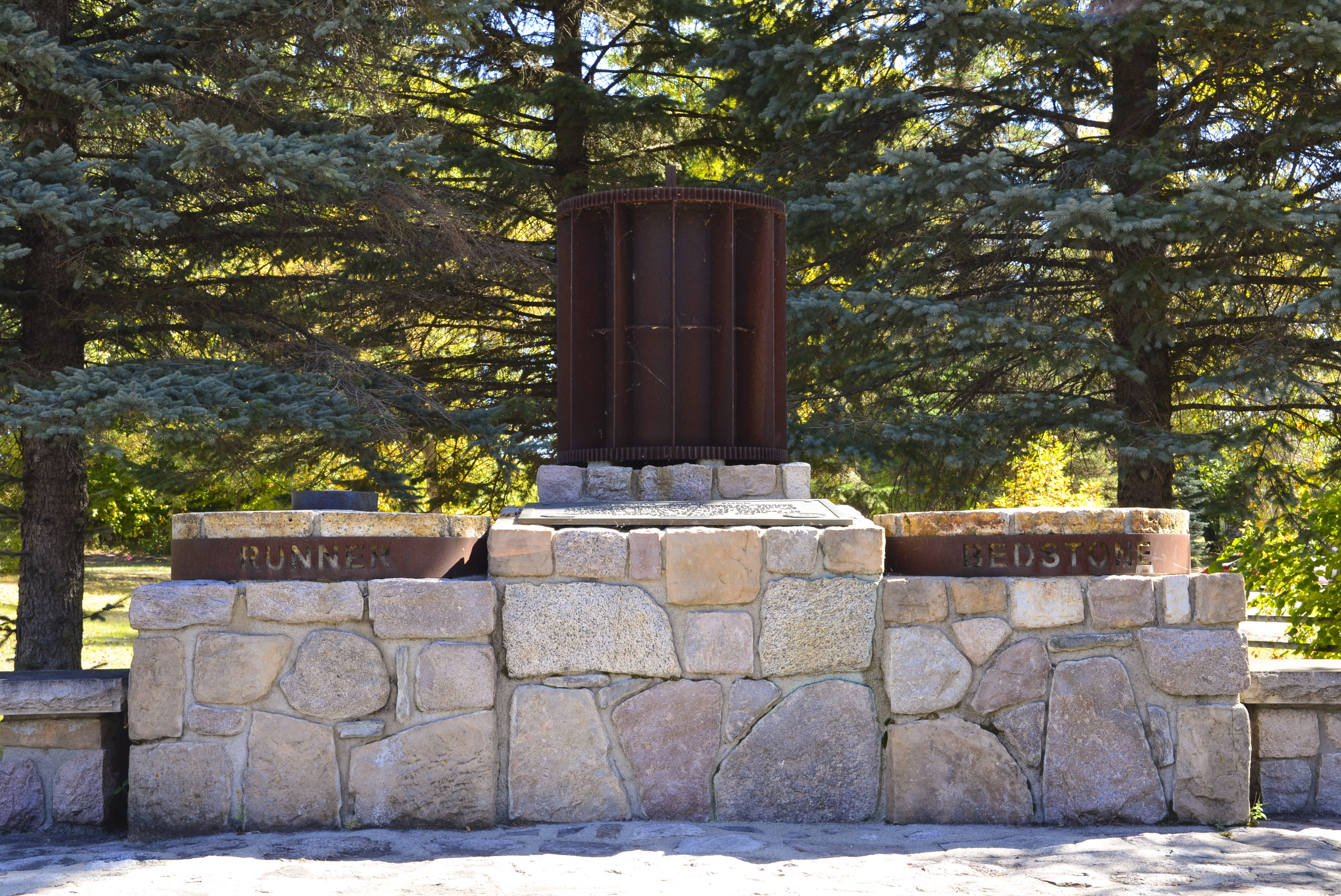

- Location within Minnesota Location within the United States
- Nearest city: Otter Tail Township, Minnesota
- Coordinates: 46°22′25″N 95°39′5″W
- Area: less than one acre
- Built: 1940
- Architect: Arthur R. Nichols; et al.
- Architectural style: NPS Rustic
- MPS: Federal Relief Construction in Minnesota MPS AD
- NRHP reference No.: 02001704
- Added to NRHP: January 16, 2003

The Craigie Flour Mill Historical Marker is a wayside rest on Minnesota State Highway 78 in Otter Tail County, Minnesota. The site was designed by landscape architect Arthur R. Nichols and built by the National Youth Administration and the Minnesota Highway Department. The style is National Park Service Rustic architecture.

The plaque on the site reads:

Craigie Flour Mill. Near this spot James Craigie of Aberdeen, Scotland, who came to Otter Tail County about 1868 built the first grist mill in the county in 1870. The mill stones and wheel were imported from Scotland. Craigie and his wife were drowned in Otter Tail Lake in 1872 and after long litigation the mill was torn down.

This text was originally printed on a steel sign, measuring 3 feet by 5 feet, which was erected by the Otter Tail County Historical Society and dedicated at a meeting on June 25, 1939 that attracted more than 2000 people. The steel plaque was replaced the following year with the more permanent wayside rest and monument.

The wayside rest is typical of the designs built by the Minnesota Highway Department around that time, with a curved drive that pulls off the main highway and a monument at the middle of the drive. The millstones and the iron water wheel are incorporated into the monument, though, which are an unusual feature for the historical markers designed by Nichols. The Fergus Falls Daily Journal reported that a Mr. Mathews had pulled the millstones from the nearby Balmoral Creek.
