= Orr Roadside Parking Area =

- U.S. National Register of Historic Places
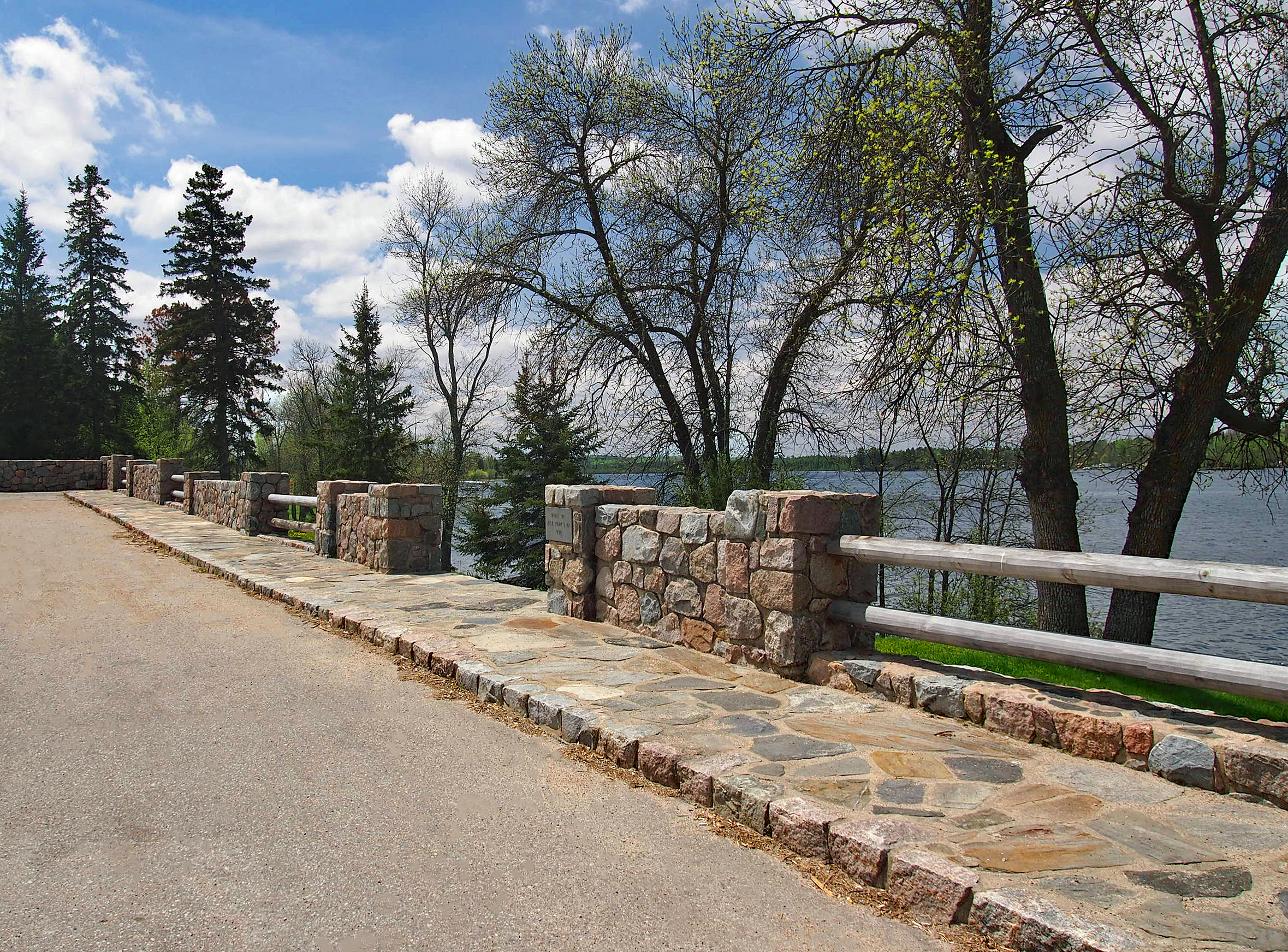
- Part of the Orr Roadside Parking Area overlooking Pelican Lake

- Location within Minnesota Location within the United States
- Location: 4573 U.S. Route 53, Orr, Minnesota
- Coordinates: 48°3′33″N 92°49′50″W
- Area: 10 acres (4.0 ha)
- Built: 1935–1938
- Built by: Civilian Conservation Corps, Minnesota Department of Highways
- Architect: Arthur R. Nichols, Harold E. Olson
- Architectural style: National Park Service rustic
- MPS: Federal Relief Construction in Minnesota MPS AD
- NRHP reference No.: 02000937
- Added to NRHP: September 6, 2002

The Orr Roadside Parking Area is a roadside park on U.S. Route 53 in Orr, Minnesota, United States. It was built from 1935 to 1938 as a New Deal project to provide motorists with recreational access to Pelican Lake. It was designed by landscape architect Arthur R. Nichols and constructed by the Civilian Conservation Corps in collaboration with the Minnesota Department of Highways. The overlook was listed on the National Register of Historic Places in 2002 for its state-level significance in the themes of landscape architecture and politics/government. It was nominated for exemplifying the early highway waysides built in Minnesota with federal work relief aid, and for exemplifying National Park Service rustic style and the work of Nichols.

== See also ==
- National Register of Historic Places listings in St. Louis County, Minnesota
