= Pelican Lake (St. Louis County, Minnesota) =

Lake in the state of Minnesota, United States

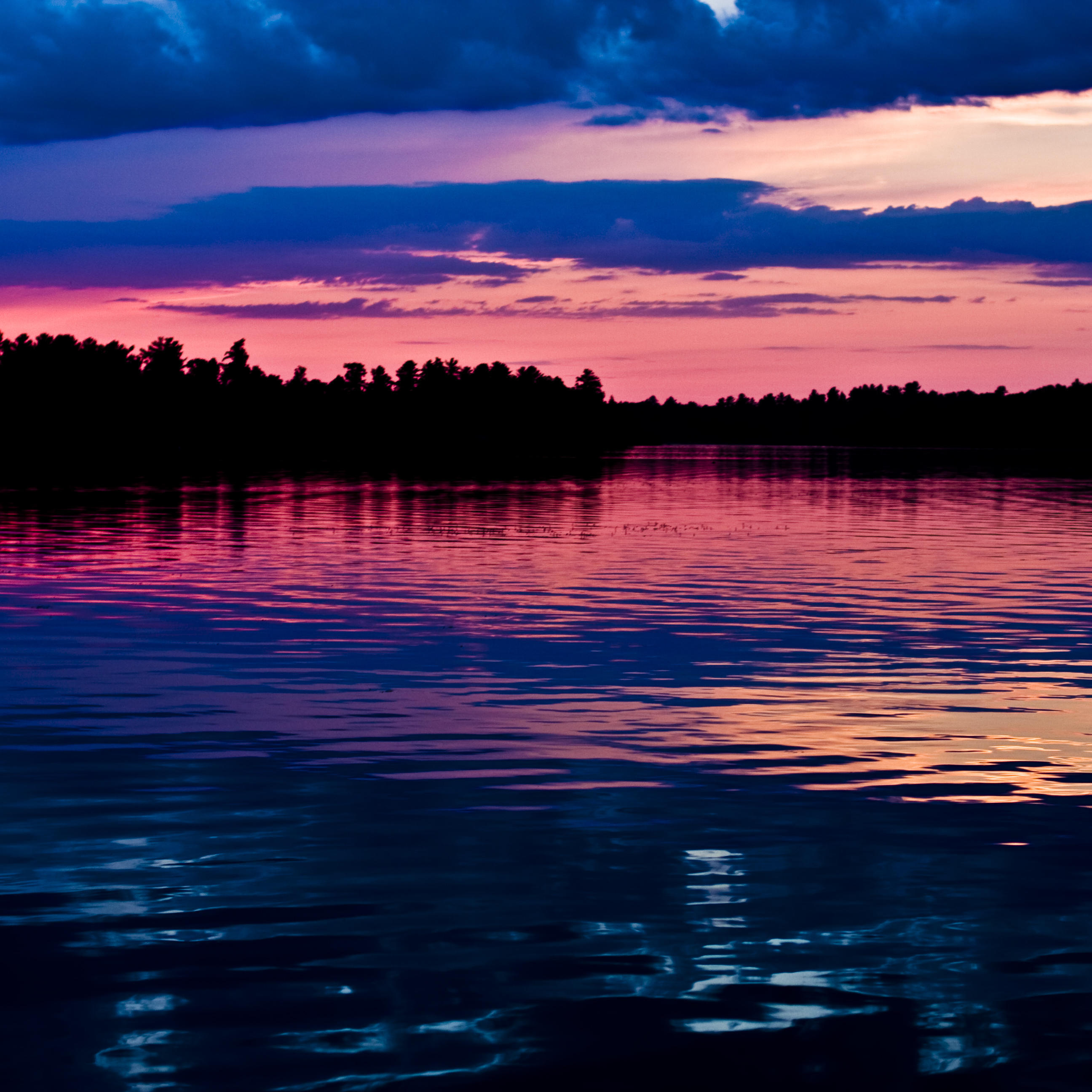

- Location within Minnesota Location within the United States
- Location: St. Louis County, Minnesota
- Coordinates: 48°03′40″N 92°54′0″W
- Basin countries: United States
- Surface area: 11,546 acres (46.73 km^{2})
- Surface elevation: 393 m (1,289 ft)

Pelican Lake is a lake in St. Louis County, Minnesota.
