= Stillwater Overlook =

Scenic viewpoint in Minnesota, U.S.

- U.S. National Register of Historic Places
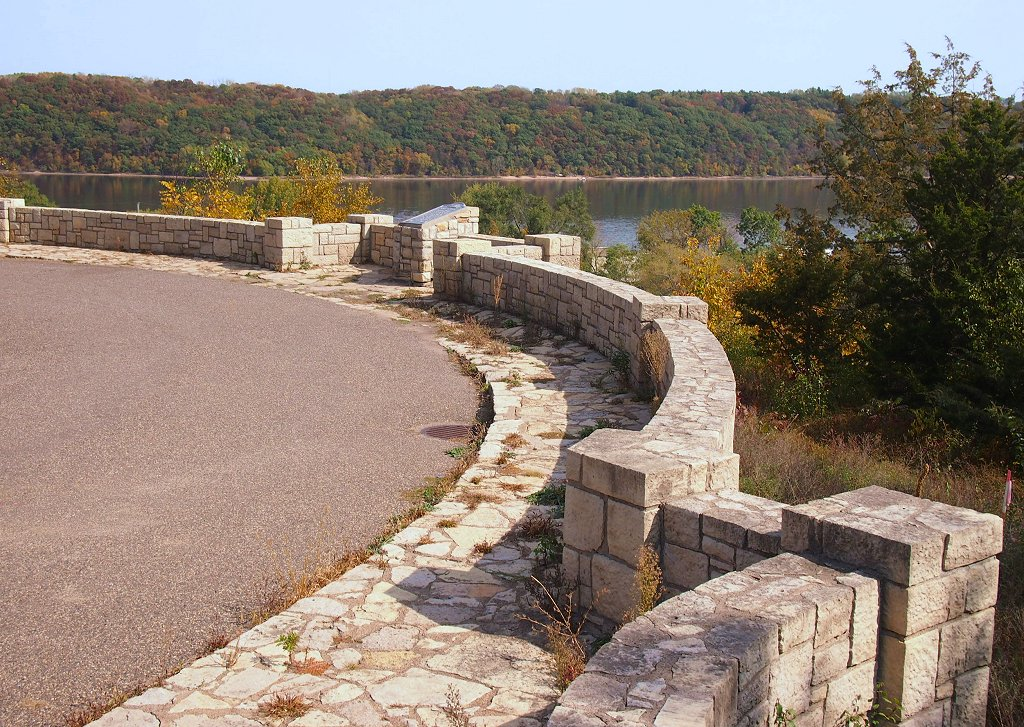
- Stillwater Overlook and the St. Croix River

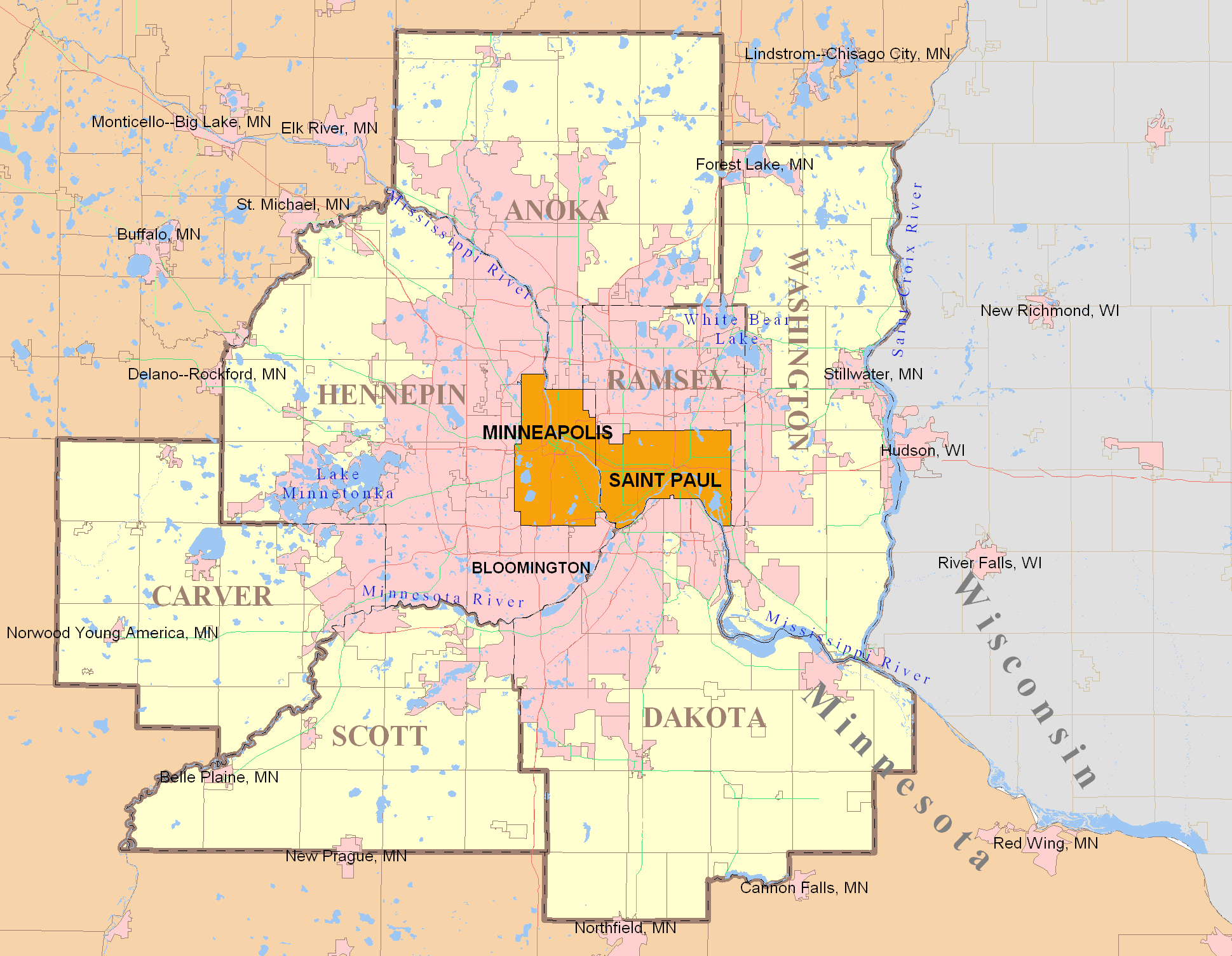
- Location within Minneapolis–Saint Paul Location within Minnesota Location within the United States
- Location: Lookout Trail near 63rd St. N., Oak Park Heights, Minnesota
- Coordinates: 45°2′26″N 92°47′45″W
- Area: 4.8 acres (1.9 ha)
- Built: 1938–9
- Built by: National Youth Administration, Minnesota Highway Department
- Architect: Arthur R. Nichols, Harold E. Olsen
- Architectural style: National Park Service Rustic
- MPS: Federal Relief Construction in Minnesota MPS
- NRHP reference No.: 07001318
- Added to NRHP: December 27, 2007

The Stillwater Overlook is a scenic overlook in Oak Park Heights, Minnesota, United States, just south of the city limits of Stillwater, near the junction of Minnesota State Highway 36 and Minnesota State Highway 95. The overlook was listed on the National Register of Historic Places in 2007 for having state-level significance in politics/government and landscape architecture. It was nominated as a leading example of the early wayside rests developed by the Minnesota Department of Highways Roadside Development Division, as well as for its sophisticated and well-preserved National Park Service rustic architecture, and for being an important work of Minnesota landscape architect Arthur R. Nichols.

The main structure on the site is a limestone wall that overlooks the St. Croix River valley. It was built by the National Youth Administration (NYA) between 1936 and 1937. The limestone was salvaged from the old Minnesota Territorial Prison, which was demolished by the NYA beginning in 1936. The construction is an excellent example of the National Park Service Rustic style, which emphasized the use of locally indigenous materials. The labor-intensive construction techniques also reflect the need to employ many people in federal relief projects. The overlook is very well preserved.

This overlook was one of several roadside development projects in the Stillwater area designed by Minnesota Highway Department landscape architect Arthur R. Nichols and built under Depression-era relief programs. Other projects in this time included an overlook north of Stillwater, a roadside parking area at the St. Croix Boom Site, and an Indian battleground historic marker. The roadside development in the Stillwater area reflected its importance as a tourist destination.

== See also ==
- National Register of Historic Places listings in Washington County, Minnesota
