= Preston Overlook =

Historic scenic overlook in Minnesota, United States

- U.S. National Register of Historic Places
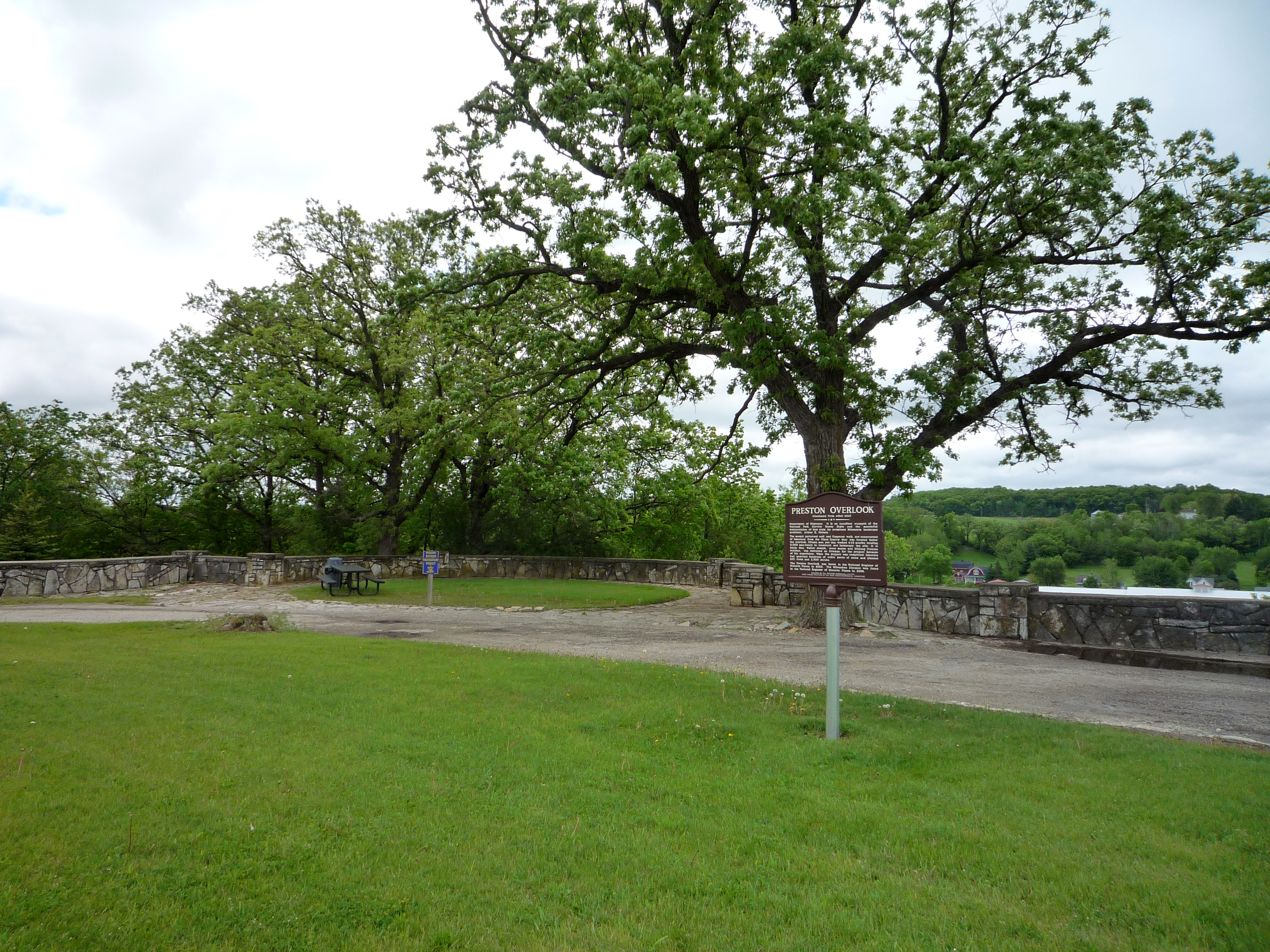

- Location within Minnesota Location within the United States
- Location: Highway 52, Preston, Minnesota
- Coordinates: 43°40′24″N 92°4′25″W
- Built: 1937–38
- Architect: Arthur R. Nichols
- Architectural style: Rustic Style
- NRHP reference No.: 03000732
- Added to NRHP: 2 August 2003

Preston Overlook is a historic scenic overlook in Preston, Minnesota, United States, North America.

== History ==
In 1937–38, the overlook was built by the Minnesota Department of Highways under the program of Federal Relief Construction in Minnesota.

The overlook was a product of its times. The Great Depression led United States President Franklin D. Roosevelt to create the New Deal, a complex package of economic programs initiated to help the economy recover and put people to work. The overlook was a project of one such plan, the National Reemployment Service. The original idea came from the Preston Women's Civic Improvement Club, which had lobbied for highway beautification. A site was chosen on the highest point on the bluffs above the Root River, 90 feet (27 m) below. The overlook was designed by Minnesota landscape architect Arthur R. Nichols in the Rustic Style. The mosaic patterned wall and flagstone walk consist of limestone quarried from below the overlook.

In 2003, the Preston Overlook was listed on the National Register of Historic Places.
