= Bridge No. 3355 (Kathio Township, Mille Lacs County, Minnesota) =

- Bridge No. 3355--Kathio Township
- U.S. National Register of Historic Places
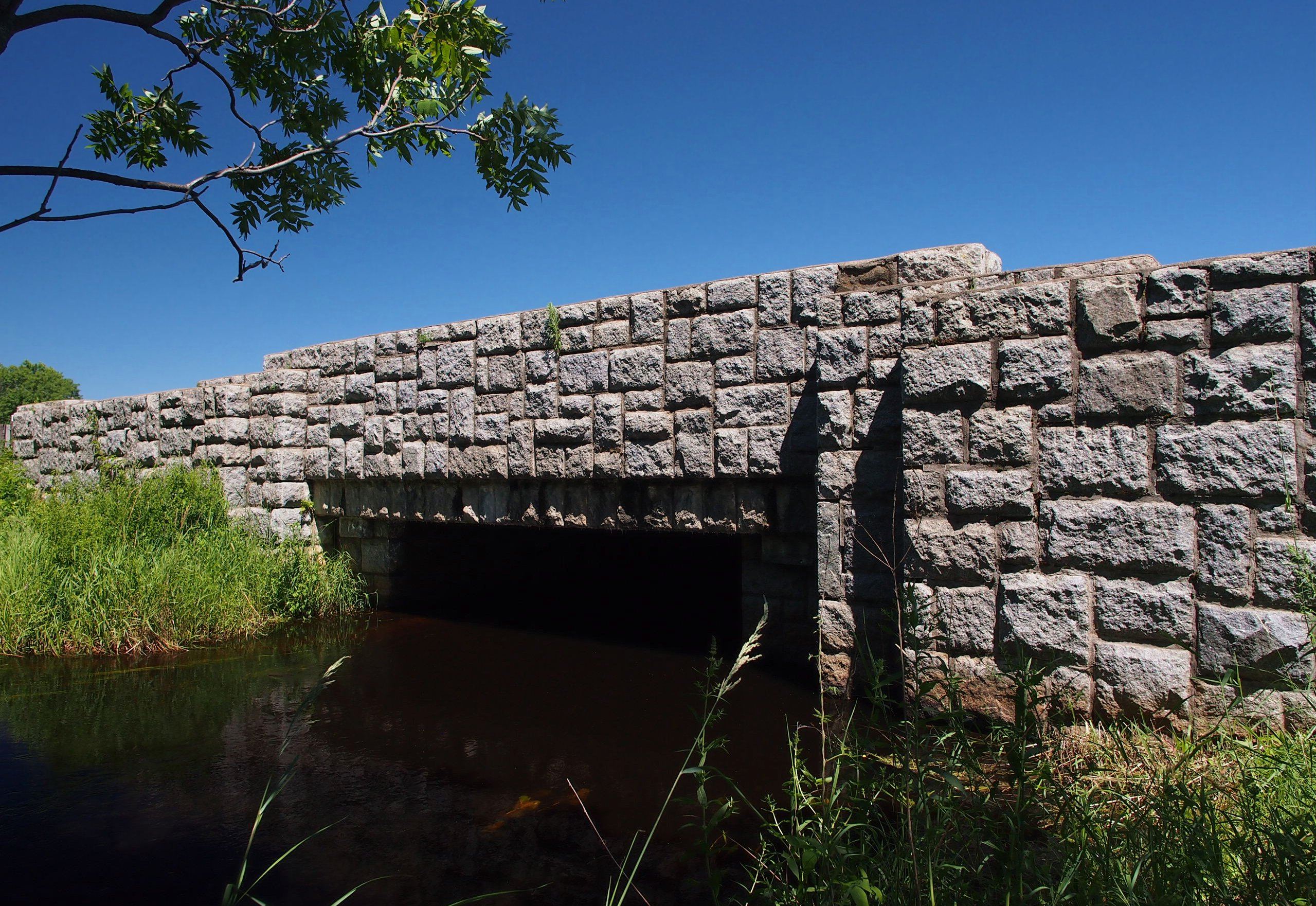
- Bridge 3355 from the southwest

- Location within Minnesota Location within the United States
- Nearest city: US 169, Kathio Township, Minnesota
- Coordinates: 46°12′55″N 93°47′34″W
- Area: less than one acre
- Built: 1939
- Built by: Civilian Conservation Corps
- Architect: National Park Service
- Architectural style: Concrete slab
- MPS: Reinforced-Concrete Highway Bridges in Minnesota MPS
- NRHP reference No.: 98000685
- Added to NRHP: June 29, 1998

Bridge Number 3355 in Kathio Township, in Mille Lacs County, Minnesota, is a concrete slab bridge that carries U.S. Route 169 (US 169) over Whitefish Creek near Mille Lacs Lake. It is listed on the National Register of Historic Places for its architectural significance, especially the ornamental stonework as designed by the National Park Service and built by the Civilian Conservation Corps.

The original bridge was built in 1921 with a span of 16 feet (4.9 m) and a width of 20 feet (6.1 m). In 1939 the bridge was widened to 60 feet (18 m) to fit the roadway and two granite sidewalks. The basic construction was still a concrete slab, but the abutment extensions, railings, and retaining walls were built of random-coursed granite. This was part of a roadside beautification and wayside development project near the town of Garrison. The elaborate stonework was undertaken as part of the work relief offered through the New Deal, so a labor-intensive approach was chosen.
