= Arthur R. Nichols =

American landscape architect

Arthur R. Nichols was a landscape architect who practiced in New York City and Minnesota in a long career from 1902 through 1960. He was a very productive landscape architect who was instrumental in bringing the field of landscape architecture to Minnesota.

Nichols was born in Springfield, Massachusetts on April 15, 1881. He attended the Massachusetts Institute of Technology and was the first graduate from its landscape architecture program in 1902. He started his career in the office of Charles Wellford Leavitt and worked there until 1909. One of the projects that Leavitt's firm had designed was Glensheen Historic Estate in Duluth, Minnesota. Nichols worked on that project, along with Anthony Morell, and the two of them moved to Minnesota and established an architectural partnership in 1909.

== Works ==
Nichols' career in Minnesota included consulting for the University of Minnesota in 1912 through 1914, the Minnesota Highway Department in 1930 through 1940, and the Minnesota State Parks Department from 1950 through 1960. Some of his more notable projects include the site plan for the Minnesota State Capitol approach in St. Paul, Northrop Mall at the University of Minnesota, Cambridge State Hospital, Willmar State Hospital, St. Catherine University, and University of Minnesota Duluth. He retired in 1953 and died in Rochester, Minnesota on January 23, 1970.

Other works listed on the National Register of Historic Places include:

- Cascade River Wayside, 3481 Minnesota State Highway 61, near Grand Marais, MN
- Craigie Flour Mill Historical Marker, Minnesota State Highway 78 at Balmoral Cr., Otter Tail Township, MN
- Dickinson State Normal School Campus District, Roughly bounded by State Ave., Fairway St., 8th Ave., W., and 2nd St., W., Dickinson, ND (Morell and Nichols, et al.)
- Graceville Historical Marker, Minnesota State Highway 28, Graceville, MN
- Hinckley State Line Marker, Minnesota State Highway 48, Ogema, MN
- Inspiration Point Wayside Rest, Minnesota State Highway 16 near Lanesboro
- Lester River Bridge, London Rd. over the Lester River, Duluth, MN (Nichols, Arthur R., et al.)
- Orr Roadside Parking Area, U.S. Route 53 at First Ave. Orr, MN
- Preston Overlook, On U.S. Route 52, Preston, MN
- Reads Landing Overlook, U.S. Route 61, Pepin Township, MN
- Stillwater Overlook, Lookout Trail near 63rd St. N., Oak Park Heights, MN (Nichols, Arthur R.; Olsen, Harold E.)

== See also ==
- Category:Arthur R. Nichols works
