= Otter Tail Township, Otter Tail County, Minnesota =

Otter Tail Township, Minnesota
- Township
- Location of Otter Tail Township, within Otter Tail County, Minnesota

- Location within the state of Minnesota Otter Tail Township, Minnesota (the United States)
- Coordinates: 46°23′47″N 95°36′14″W
- Country: United States
- State: Minnesota
- County: Otter Tail

Area
  - Total: 30.4 sq mi (78.8 km^{2})
  - Land: 16.4 sq mi (42.4 km^{2})
  - Water: 14.1 sq mi (36.4 km^{2})
- Elevation: 1,350 ft (410 m)

Population (2020)
  - Total: 602
  - Density: 36.8/sq mi (14.2/km^{2})
- Time zone: UTC-6 (Central (CST))
  - Summer (DST): UTC-5 (CDT)
- ZIP code: 56571
- Area code: 218
- FIPS code: 27-49228
- GNIS feature ID: 0665239

Otter Tail Township is a township in Otter Tail County, Minnesota, United States. The population was 602 at the 2020 census.

Otter Tail Township was organized in 1870, and named after Otter Tail Lake.

== Geography ==
According to the United States Census Bureau, the township has a total area of 30.4 square miles (78.8 km^{2}), of which 16.4 square miles (42.4 km^{2}) is land and 14.1 square miles (36.4 km^{2}) (46.25%) is water.

== Demographics ==
As of the census of 2000, there were 556 people, 241 households, and 187 families residing in the township. The population density was 34.0 inhabitants per square mile (13.1/km^{2}). There were 644 housing units at an average density of 39.4 per square mile (15.2/km^{2}). The racial makeup of the township was 98.74% White, 0.36% Native American, 0.18% Asian, 0.54% Pacific Islander, and 0.18% from two or more races. Hispanic or Latino of any race were 1.08% of the population.

There were 241 households, out of which 22.4% had children under the age of 18 living with them, 69.7% were married couples living together, 6.2% had a female householder with no husband present, and 22.0% were non-families. 19.5% of all households were made up of individuals, and 7.9% had someone living alone who was 65 years of age or older. The average household size was 2.31 and the average family size was 2.63.

In the township the population was spread out, with 18.3% under the age of 18, 3.8% from 18 to 24, 19.4% from 25 to 44, 35.6% from 45 to 64, and 22.8% who were 65 years of age or older. The median age was 51 years. For every 100 females, there were 95.1 males. For every 100 females age 18 and over, there were 96.5 males.

The median income for a household in the township was $37,000, and the median income for a family was $38,667. Males had a median income of $28,250 versus $21,875 for females. The per capita income for the township was $21,931. About 8.9% of families and 9.1% of the population were below the poverty line, including 12.7% of those under age 18 and 4.2% of those age 65 or over.
