= Garrison Township, Crow Wing County, Minnesota =

Township in Minnesota, United States

Garrison Township
- Township
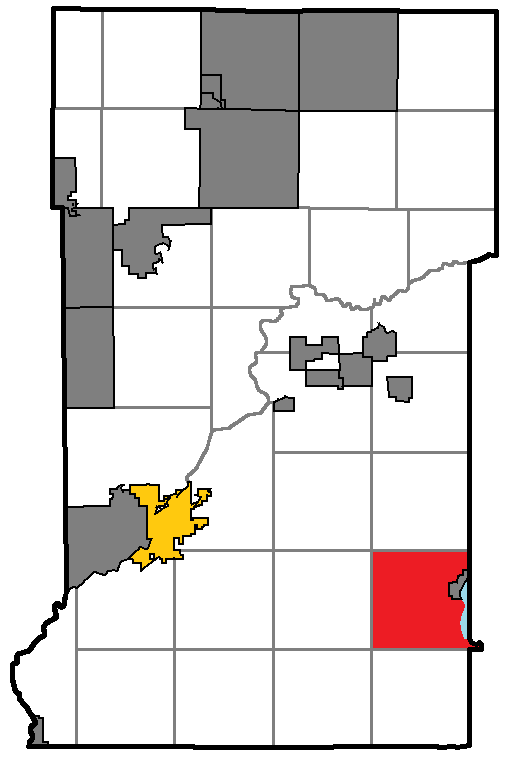
- Location of Garrison Township, within Crow Wing County, Minnesota
- Coordinates: 46°17′10″N 93°51′7″W
- Country: United States
- State: Minnesota
- County: Crow Wing

Area
  - Total: 35.4 sq mi (91.8 km^{2})
  - Land: 29.3 sq mi (75.9 km^{2})
  - Water: 6.1 sq mi (15.9 km^{2})
- Elevation: 1,296 ft (395 m)

Population (2020)
  - Total: 837
  - Density: 28.6/sq mi (11.0/km^{2})
- Time zone: UTC-6 (Central (CST))
  - Summer (DST): UTC-5 (CDT)
- ZIP code: 56450
- Area code: 320
- FIPS code: 27-23210
- GNIS feature ID: 0664249

Garrison Township is a township in Crow Wing County, Minnesota, United States. The population was 837 at the 2020 census. Within the township is the city of Garrison.

Garrison Township was named for Oscar E. Garrison, a surveyor who lived there.

== Geography ==
According to the United States Census Bureau, the township has a total area of 35.4 square miles (92 km^{2}), of which 29.3 square miles (76 km^{2}) is land and 6.1 square miles (16 km^{2}) (17.30%) is water.

== Demographics ==
As of the census of 2000, there were 796 people, 355 households, and 246 families residing in the township. The population density was 27.2 inhabitants per square mile (10.5/km^{2}). There were 781 housing units at an average density of 26.6 per square mile (10.3/km^{2}). The racial makeup of the township was 97.49% White, 0.13% African American, 1.26% Native American, 0.38% from other races, and 0.75% from two or more races. Hispanic or Latino of any race were 0.38% of the population.

There were 355 households, out of which 18.3% had children under the age of 18 living with them, 62.0% were married couples living together, 4.5% had a female householder with no husband present, and 30.7% were non-families. 22.3% of all households were made up of individuals, and 7.3% had someone living alone who was 65 years of age or older. The average household size was 2.24 and the average family size was 2.61.

In the township the population was spread out, with 18.3% under the age of 18, 6.7% from 18 to 24, 20.2% from 25 to 44, 34.5% from 45 to 64, and 20.2% who were 65 years of age or older. The median age was 48 years. For every 100 females, there were 108.9 males. For every 100 females age 18 and over, there were 110.4 males.

The median income for a household in the township was $33,421, and the median income for a family was $34,821. Males had a median income of $31,635 versus $23,456 for females. The per capita income for the township was $19,004. About 5.4% of families and 7.8% of the population were below the poverty line, including 9.2% of those under age 18 and 2.9% of those age 65 or over.
