= Bridge No. 5265-Garrison =

Historic bridge near Garrison, Minnesota

- U.S. National Register of Historic Places
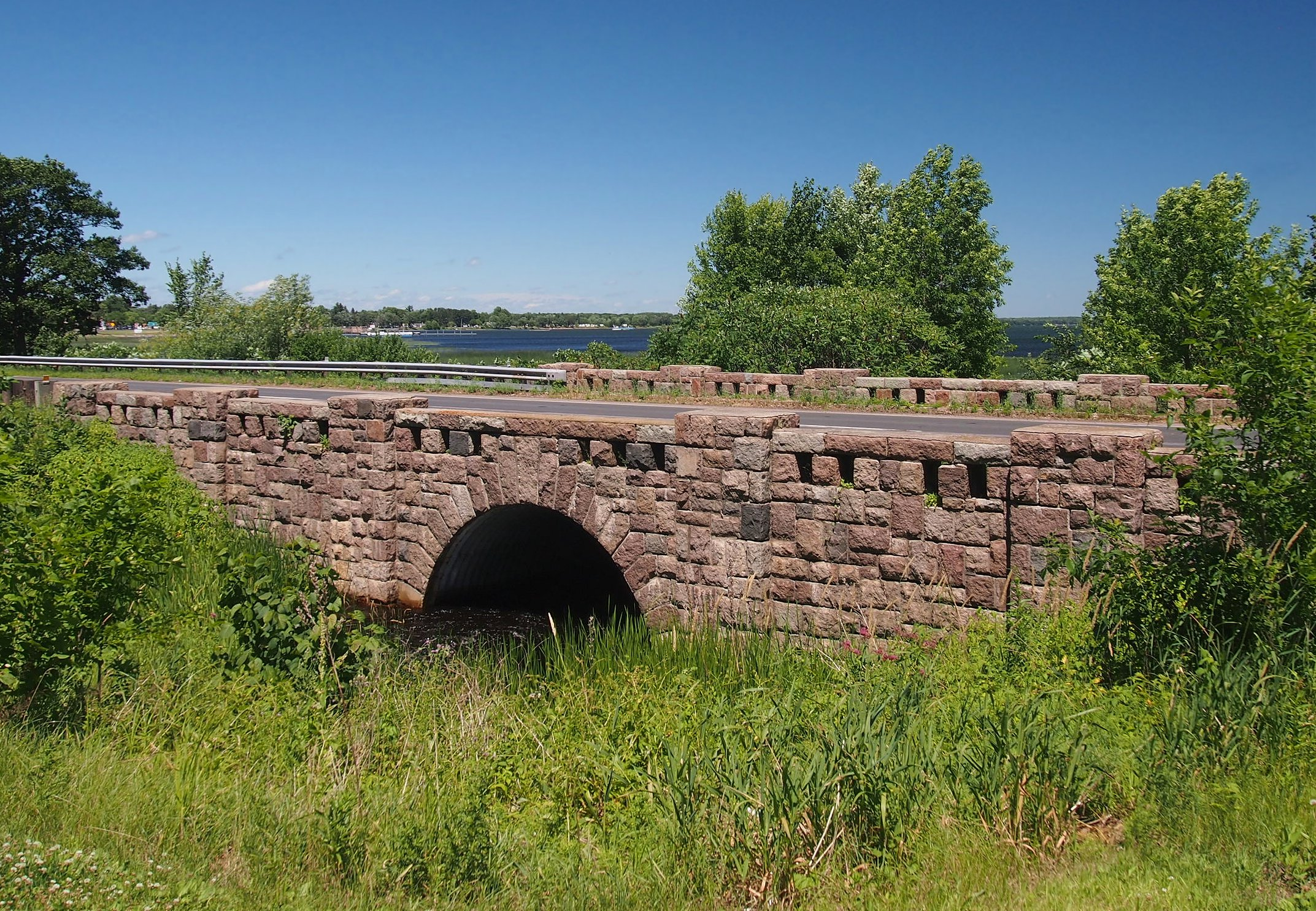
- Bridge 5265 viewed from the southwest.

- Location within Minnesota
- Location: US 169 near Mille Lacs Lake, Garrison, Minnesota
- Coordinates: 46°17′19″N 93°49′29″W
- Area: less than one acre
- Built: 1938
- Built by: Civilian Conservation Corps
- Architect: National Park Service
- Architectural style: Multi-plate arch
- MPS: Iron and Steel Bridges in Minnesota MPS
- NRHP reference No.: 98000681
- Added to NRHP: June 29, 1998

Bridge No. 5265 is a multi-plate arch bridge that carries U.S. Highway 169 (US 169) over a pedestrian walkway leading to Mille Lacs Lake near Garrison, Minnesota. The bridge actually has two tiers: the upper tier has a concrete floor with a 14-foot (4.3 m) span and a 125-foot (38 m) barrel. Below that, hidden below grade are two concrete-roofed box culverts, each about 6 feet (1.8 m) in span. The bridge was listed on the National Register of Historic Places in 1998.

The bridge plans were drawn by the National Park Service in early 1938. The multi-plate arch material was introduced by Armco in 1931 and consisted of galvanized, corrugated iron fabricated in curved segments. These segments could be bolted together in the field to form an arch. Usually the arch would be anchored by concrete headwalls and abutments, but this bridge was built entirely of stone. This fit in well with the New Deal goals of promoting highway beautification, local craft skills, and labor-intensive public works projects. The bridge was rehabilitated in 2019 to repair the stone masonry and reinforce the deteriorating multi-plate arch. It remains one of Minnesota's best multi-plate arch bridges because of its well-crafted stonework and architectural detailing.
