= Garrison, Minnesota =

City in Minnesota, United States

Garrison
- City
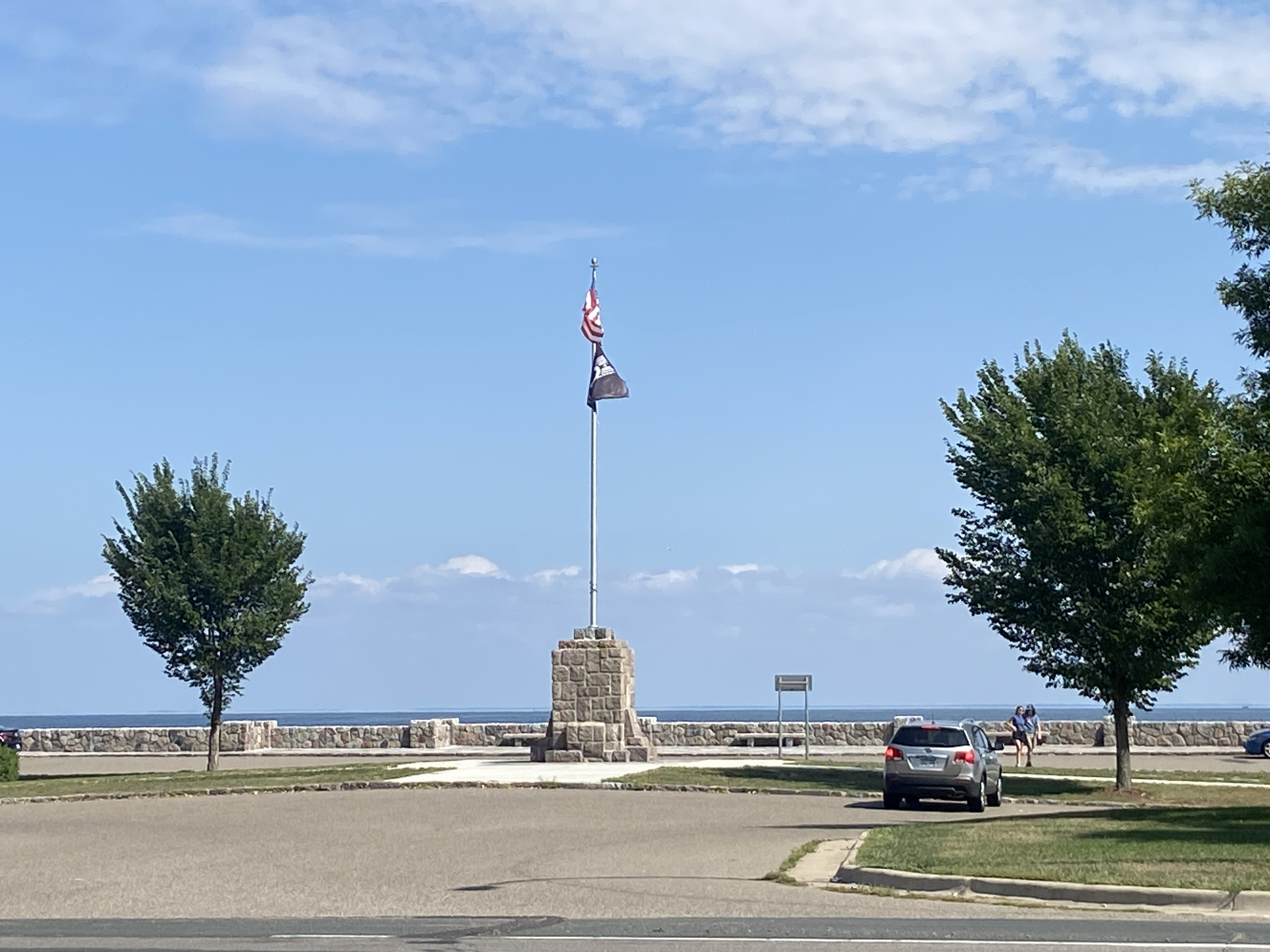
- Garrison Bay and memorial

- Location of Garrison within Crow Wing County, Minnesota
- Coordinates: 46°17′57″N 93°49′35″W
- Country: United States
- State: Minnesota
- County: Crow Wing

Area
  - Total: 1.05 sq mi (2.71 km^{2})
  - Land: 1.05 sq mi (2.71 km^{2})
  - Water: 0 sq mi (0.00 km^{2})
- Elevation: 1,257 ft (383 m)

Population (2020)
  - Total: 194
  - Density: 185.3/sq mi (71.55/km^{2})
- Time zone: UTC-6 (Central (CST))
  - Summer (DST): UTC-5 (CDT)
- ZIP code: 56450
- Area code: 320
- FIPS code: 27-23192
- GNIS feature ID: 2394859
- Website: City website

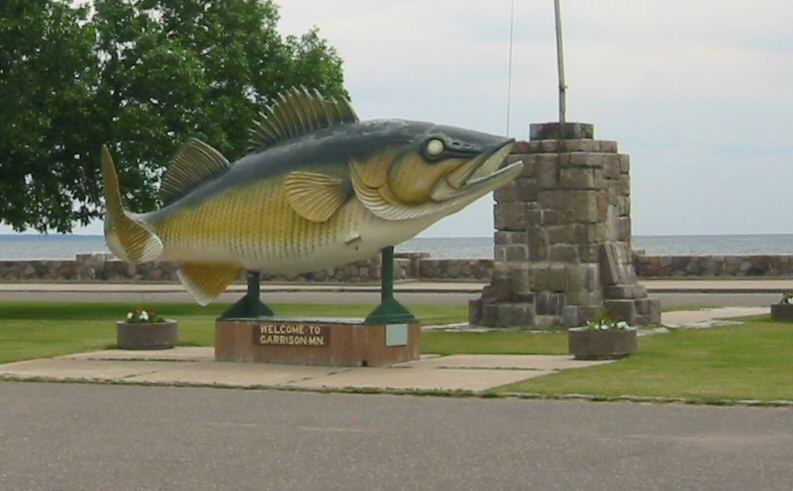
This giant walleye statue, standing in a park along U.S. Highway 169, greets visitors to Garrison and promises great fishing in Mille Lacs.

Garrison is a city in Crow Wing County, Minnesota, United States, along Mille Lacs Lake. As of the 2020 census, Garrison had a population of 194. It is part of the Brainerd Micropolitan Statistical Area. U.S. Highway 169 and Minnesota State Highway 18 are the main routes in the community.

== History ==
Garrison was platted and settled in 1880 as Midland. Garrison was incorporated in May 1937. The surrounding Garrison Township was named in honor of Oscar E. Garrison, a land surveyor and civil engineer. Oscar E. Garrison had also platted Wayzata in Hennepin County in 1854. The post office at Garrison was established in 1884.

== Geography ==
According to the United States Census Bureau, the city has a total area of 1.10 square miles (2.85 km^{2}), all land.

The city of Garrison is located within Garrison Township geographically but is a separate entity. Garrison is located in the southeast part of Crow Wing County. Garrison is located along the northwest shoreline of Mille Lacs Lake.

Garrison is the world's smallest city to have a McDonald's restaurant.

== Demographics ==
Historical population
Census	Pop.	Note	%±
1940	211		—
1950	150		−28.9%
1960	118		−21.3%
1970	125		5.9%
1980	174		39.2%
1990	138		−20.7%
2000	213		54.3%
2010	210		−1.4%
2020	194		−7.6%
U.S. Decennial Census

=== 2010 census ===
As of the census of 2010, there were 210 people, 107 households, and 51 families living in the city. The population density was 190.9 inhabitants per square mile (73.7/km^{2}). There were 184 housing units at an average density of 167.3 per square mile (64.6/km^{2}). The racial makeup of the city was 96.7% White, 0.5% Native American, and 2.9% from two or more races. Hispanic or Latino of any race were 1.4% of the population.

There were 107 households, of which 14.0% had children under the age of 18 living with them, 32.7% were married couples living together, 8.4% had a female householder with no husband present, 6.5% had a male householder with no wife present, and 52.3% were non-families. 38.3% of all households were made up of individuals, and 14.9% had someone living alone who was 65 years of age or older. The average household size was 1.96 and the average family size was 2.47.

The median age in the city was 49.8 years. 11.9% of residents were under the age of 18; 7.1% were between the ages of 18 and 24; 19.5% were from 25 to 44; 33.4% were from 45 to 64; and 28.1% were 65 years of age or older. The gender makeup of the city was 48.6% male and 51.4% female.

=== 2000 census ===
As of the census of 2000, there were 213 people, 113 households, and 48 families living in the city. The population density was 198.9 inhabitants per square mile (76.8/km^{2}). There were 191 housing units at an average density of 178.4 per square mile (68.9/km^{2}). The racial makeup of the city was 97.65% White, 0.94% Native American, and 1.41% from two or more races. Hispanic or Latino of any race were 0.94% of the population.

There were 113 households, out of which 11.5% had children under the age of 18 living with them, 35.4% were married couples living together, 1.8% had a female householder with no husband present, and 57.5% were non-families. 44.2% of all households were made up of individuals, and 19.5% had someone living alone who was 65 years of age or older. The average household size was 1.88 and the average family size was 2.67.

In the city, the population was spread out, with 15.0% under the age of 18, 4.2% from 18 to 24, 22.5% from 25 to 44, 32.4% from 45 to 64, and 25.8% who were 65 years of age or older. The median age was 52 years. For every 100 females, there were 117.3 males. For every 100 females age 18 and over, there were 118.1 males.

The median income for a household in the city was $23,750, and the median income for a family was $36,250. Males had a median income of $25,417 versus $19,000 for females. The per capita income for the city was $19,447. About 10.5% of families and 14.7% of the population were below the poverty line, including 29.4% of those under the age of eighteen and 19.1% of those 65 or over.

== Education ==
It is in Brainerd Public Schools. The zoned high school is Brainerd High School.
